The 2018 United States House of Representatives elections in California were held on November 6, 2018, with the primary elections being held on June 5, 2018. Voters elected the 53 U.S. representatives from the state of California, one from each of the state's 53 congressional districts. The elections coincided with the elections of other offices, including a gubernatorial election, other elections to the House of Representatives, elections to the United States Senate, and various state and local elections.

Democrats won in seven congressional districts previously represented by Republicans, all of which voted for Hillary Clinton in 2016. This reduced the California House Republican delegation by half and left the Republican Party with the fewest seats in California since just before the 1946 election cycle.

Republican incumbents Jeff Denham, David Valadao, Steve Knight, Mimi Walters, and fifteen-term incumbent Dana Rohrabacher were all defeated. Democrats also picked up two open seats previously held by retiring GOP incumbents: thirteen-term incumbent Ed Royce and nine-term incumbent Darrell Issa. The seven Democratic House pickups in California were the most made by the party in the 2018 election cycle.

Overview

By district

Results of the 2018 United States House of Representatives elections in California by district:

Notes

Results

District 1 

The 1st district is based in inland Northern California and includes Chico and Redding.

After advancing to the general election, Democratic candidate Audrey Denney was forced to pause her campaign for emergency tumor-removal surgery in August, but returned in time to debate LaMalfa in September. She lost having received 45.1% of the vote, but won the Democratic party nomination for the 2020 election. Republican Doug LaMalfa, who had represented the 1st district since 2013, won re-election with 54.9% of the vote.

|- class="vcard"
| style="background-color: #E81B23; width: 2px;" |
| class="org" style="width: 130px" | Republican
| class="fn"    | Doug LaMalfa (incumbent)
| style="text-align:right;" | 98,354
| style="text-align:right;" | 51.7
|-
|- class="vcard"
| style="background-color: #3333FF; width: 2px;" |
| class="org" style="width: 130px" | Democratic
| class="fn"    | Audrey Denney
| style="text-align:right;" | 34,121
| style="text-align:right;" | 17.9
|-
|- class="vcard"
| style="background-color: #3333FF; width: 2px;" |
| class="org" style="width: 130px" | Democratic
| class="fn"    | Jessica Holcombe
| style="text-align:right;" | 22,306
| style="text-align:right;" | 11.7
|-
|- class="vcard"
| style="background-color: #3333FF; width: 2px;" |
| class="org" style="width: 130px" | Democratic
| class="fn"    | Marty Waters
| style="text-align:right;" | 16,032
| style="text-align:right;" | 8.4
|-
|- class="vcard"
| style="background-color: #E81B23; width: 2px;" |
| class="org" style="width: 130px" | Republican
| class="fn"    | Gregory Cheadle
| style="text-align:right;" | 11,660
| style="text-align:right;" | 6.1
|-
|- class="vcard"
| style="background-color: #3333FF; width: 2px;" |
| class="org" style="width: 130px" | Democratic
| class="fn"    | David Peterson
| style="text-align:right;" | 5,707
| style="text-align:right;" | 3.0
|-
|- class="vcard"
| style="background-color: #17aa5c; width: 2px;" |
| class="org" style="width: 130px" | Green
| class="fn"    | Lewis Elbinger
| style="text-align:right;" | 2,191
| style="text-align:right;" | 1.2
|-

|- class="vcard"
| style="background-color: #E81B23; width: 5px;" |
| class="org" style="width: 130px" | Republican 
| class="fn" | Doug LaMalfa (incumbent) 
| style="text-align: right; margin-right: 0.5em" |  
| style="text-align: right; margin-right: 0.5em" | 54.9 
|-
|- class="vcard"
| style="background-color: #3333FF; width: 2px;" |
| class="org" style="width: 130px" | Democratic
| class="fn"    | Audrey Denney
| style="text-align:right;" | 131,548
| style="text-align:right;" | 45.1
|-

District 2 

The 2nd district is based in California's North Coast and includes Marin County and Eureka. Democrat Jared Huffman, who had represented the 2nd district since 2013, won re-election.

|- class="vcard"
| style="background-color: #3333FF; width: 2px;" |
| class="org" style="width: 130px" | Democratic
| class="fn"    | Jared Huffman (incumbent)
| style="text-align:right;" | 144,005
| style="text-align:right;" | 72.5
|-
|- class="vcard"
| style="background-color: #E81B23; width: 2px;" |
| class="org" style="width: 130px" | Republican
| class="fn"    | Dale K. Mensing
| style="text-align:right;" | 41,607
| style="text-align:right;" | 20.9
|-
|- class="vcard"
| style="background-color: #3333FF; width: 2px;" |
| class="org" style="width: 130px" | Democratic
| class="fn"    | Andy Caffrey
| style="text-align:right;" | 13,072
| style="text-align:right;" | 6.6
|-

|- class="vcard"
| style="background-color: #3333FF; width: 5px;" |
| class="org" style="width: 130px" | Democratic 
| class="fn" | Jared Huffman (incumbent) 
| style="text-align: right; margin-right: 0.5em" |  
| style="text-align: right; margin-right: 0.5em" | 77.0 
|-
|- class="vcard"
| style="background-color: #E81B23; width: 2px;" |
| class="org" style="width: 130px" | Republican
| class="fn"    | Dale K. Mensing
| style="text-align:right;" | 72,576
| style="text-align:right;" | 23.0
|-

Endorsements

District 3 

The 3rd district is based in north central California and includes Davis, Fairfield, and Yuba City. Democrat John Garamendi, who had represented the 3rd district since 2013 and previously represented the 10th district from 2009 to 2013, won re-election.

|- class="vcard"
| style="background-color: #3333FF; width: 2px;" |
| class="org" style="width: 130px" | Democratic
| class="fn"    | John Garamendi (incumbent)
| style="text-align:right;" | 74,552
| style="text-align:right;" | 53.6
|-
|- class="vcard"
| style="background-color: #E81B23; width: 2px;" |
| class="org" style="width: 130px" | Republican
| class="fn"    | Charlie Schaupp
| style="text-align:right;" | 58,598
| style="text-align:right;" | 42.1
|-
|- class="vcard"
| style="background-color: #3333FF; width: 2px;" |
| class="org" style="width: 130px" | Democratic
| class="fn"    | Kevin Puett
| style="text-align:right;" | 5,971
| style="text-align:right;" | 4.3
|-

|- class="vcard"
| style="background-color: #3333FF; width: 5px;" |
| class="org" style="width: 130px" | Democratic 
| class="fn" | John Garamendi (incumbent) 
| style="text-align: right; margin-right: 0.5em" |  
| style="text-align: right; margin-right: 0.5em" | 58.1 
|-
|- class="vcard"
| style="background-color: #E81B23; width: 2px;" |
| class="org" style="width: 130px" | Republican
| class="fn"    | Charlie Schaupp
| style="text-align:right;" | 97,376
| style="text-align:right;" | 41.9
|-

Endorsements

District 4 

The 4th district is based in east central California and includes Lake Tahoe, Roseville, and Yosemite National Park. Republican Tom McClintock, who had represented the 4th district since 2009, won re-election against Democrat Jessica Morse.

|- class="vcard"
| style="background-color: #E81B23; width: 2px;" |
| class="org" style="width: 130px" | Republican
| class="fn"    | Tom McClintock (incumbent)
| style="text-align:right;" | 109,679
| style="text-align:right;" | 51.8
|-
|- class="vcard"
| style="background-color: #3333FF; width: 2px;" |
| class="org" style="width: 130px" | Democratic
| class="fn"    | Jessica Morse
| style="text-align:right;" | 42,942
| style="text-align:right;" | 20.3
|-
|- class="vcard"
| style="background-color: #3333FF; width: 2px;" |
| class="org" style="width: 130px" | Democratic
| class="fn"    | Regina Bateson
| style="text-align:right;" | 26,303
| style="text-align:right;" | 12.4
|-
|- class="vcard"
| style="background-color: #E81B23; width: 2px;" |
| class="org" style="width: 130px" | Republican
| class="fn"    | Mitchell White
| style="text-align:right;" | 14,433
| style="text-align:right;" | 6.8
|-
|- class="vcard"
| style="background-color: #3333FF; width: 2px;" |
| class="org" style="width: 130px" | Democratic
| class="fn"    | Roza Calderon
| style="text-align:right;" | 13,621
| style="text-align:right;" | 6.4
|-
|- class="vcard"
| style="background-color: #3333FF; width: 2px;" |
| class="org" style="width: 130px" | Democratic
| class="fn"    | Robert Lawton
| style="text-align:right;" | 4,593
| style="text-align:right;" | 2.2
|-

|- class="vcard"
| style="background-color: #E81B23; width: 5px;" |
| class="org" style="width: 130px" | Republican 
| class="fn" | Tom McClintock (incumbent) 
| style="text-align: right; margin-right: 0.5em" |  
| style="text-align: right; margin-right: 0.5em" | 54.1
|-
|- class="vcard"
| style="background-color: #3333FF; width: 2px;" |
| class="org" style="width: 130px" | Democratic
| class="fn"    | Jessica Morse
| style="text-align:right;" | 156,253
| style="text-align:right;" | 45.9
|-

Endorsements

Polling

District 5 

The 5th district is based in the North Bay and includes Napa, Santa Rosa, and Vallejo. Democrat Mike Thompson, who had represented the 5th district since 2013 and previously represented the 1st district from 1999 to 2013, won re-election.

|- class="vcard"
| style="background-color: #3333FF; width: 2px;" |
| class="org" style="width: 130px" | Democratic
| class="fn"    | Mike Thompson (incumbent)
| style="text-align:right;" | 121,428
| style="text-align:right;" | 79.3
|-
|- class="vcard"
| style="background-color: #DDDDDD; width: 2px;" |
| class="org" style="width: 130px" | No party preference
| class="fn"    | Anthony Mills
| style="text-align:right;" | 13,538
| style="text-align:right;" | 8.8
|-
|- class="vcard"
| style="background-color: #DDDDDD; width: 2px;" |
| class="org" style="width: 130px" | No party preference
| class="fn"    | Nils Palsson
| style="text-align:right;" | 12,652
| style="text-align:right;" | 8.3
|-
|- class="vcard"
| style="background-color: #17aa5c; width: 2px;" |
| class="org" style="width: 130px" | Green
| class="fn"    | Jason Kishineff
| style="text-align:right;" | 5,458
| style="text-align:right;" | 3.6
|-

|- class="vcard"
| style="background-color: #3333FF; width: 5px;" |
| class="org" style="width: 130px" | Democratic 
| class="fn" | Mike Thompson (incumbent) 
| style="text-align: right; margin-right: 0.5em" |  
| style="text-align: right; margin-right: 0.5em" | 78.9 
|-
|- class="vcard"
| style="background-color: #DDDDDD; width: 2px;" |
| class="org" style="width: 130px" | No party preference
| class="fn"    | Anthony Mills
| style="text-align:right;" | 55,158
| style="text-align:right;" | 21.1
|-

Endorsements

District 6 

The 6th district is based in north central California and includes Sacramento. Democrat Doris Matsui, who had represented the 6th district since 2013 and previously represented the 5th district from 2005 to 2013, won re-election against fellow Democrat, Jrmar Jefferson.

|- class="vcard"
| style="background-color: #3333FF; width: 2px;" |
| class="org" style="width: 130px" | Democratic
| class="fn"    | Doris Matsui (incumbent)
| style="text-align:right;" | 99,789
| style="text-align:right;" | 87.9
|-
|- class="vcard"
| style="background-color: #3333FF; width: 2px;" |
| class="org" style="width: 130px" | Democratic
| class="fn"    | Jrmar Jefferson
| style="text-align:right;" | 13,786
| style="text-align:right;" | 12.1
|-
|- class="vcard"
| style="background-color: #3333FF; width: 2px;" |
| class="org" style="width: 130px" | Democratic
| class="fn"    | Ralph Nwobi (write-in)
| style="text-align:right;" | 9
| style="text-align:right;" | 0.0
|-

|- class="vcard"
| style="background-color: #3333FF; width: 5px;" |
| class="org" style="width: 130px" | Democratic 
| class="fn" | Doris Matsui (incumbent) 
| style="text-align: right; margin-right: 0.5em" |  
| style="text-align: right; margin-right: 0.5em" | 80.4 
|-
|- class="vcard"
| style="background-color: #3333FF; width: 2px;" |
| class="org" style="width: 130px" | Democratic
| class="fn"    | Jrmar Jefferson
| style="text-align:right;" | 39,528
| style="text-align:right;" | 19.6
|-

District 7 

The 7th district is based in north central California and includes southern and eastern Sacramento County. Democrat Ami Bera, who had represented the 7th district since 2013, won re-election.

|- class="vcard"
| style="background-color: #3333FF; width: 2px;" |
| class="org" style="width: 130px" | Democratic
| class="fn"    | Ami Bera (incumbent)
| style="text-align:right;" | 84,776
| style="text-align:right;" | 51.7
|-
|- class="vcard"
| style="background-color: #E81B23; width: 2px;" |
| class="org" style="width: 130px" | Republican
| class="fn"    | Andrew Grant
| style="text-align:right;" | 51,221
| style="text-align:right;" | 31.2
|-
|- class="vcard"
| style="background-color: #E81B23; width: 2px;" |
| class="org" style="width: 130px" | Republican
| class="fn"    | Yona Barash
| style="text-align:right;" | 22,845
| style="text-align:right;" | 13.9
|-
|- class="vcard"
| style="background-color: #17aa5c; width: 2px;" |
| class="org" style="width: 130px" | Green
| class="fn"    | Robert Christian "Chris" Richardson
| style="text-align:right;" | 3,183
| style="text-align:right;" | 1.9
|-
|- class="vcard"
| style="background-color: #DDDDDD; width: 2px;" |
| class="org" style="width: 130px" | No party preference
| class="fn"    | Reginald Claytor
| style="text-align:right;" | 2,095
| style="text-align:right;" | 1.3
|-

|- class="vcard"
| style="background-color: #3333FF; width: 5px;" |
| class="org" style="width: 130px" | Democratic 
| class="fn" | Ami Bera (incumbent) 
| style="text-align: right; margin-right: 0.5em" |  
| style="text-align: right; margin-right: 0.5em" | 55.0 
|-
|- class="vcard"
| style="background-color: #E81B23; width: 2px;" |
| class="org" style="width: 130px" | Republican
| class="fn"    | Andrew Grant
| style="text-align:right;" | 126,601
| style="text-align:right;" | 45.0
|-

Endorsements

Polling

District 8 

The 8th district is based in the eastern High Desert and includes Victorville and Yucaipa. Republican Paul Cook, who had represented the 8th district since 2013, won re-election.

|- class="vcard"
| style="background-color: #E81B23; width: 2px;" |
| class="org" style="width: 130px" | Republican
| class="fn"    | Paul Cook (incumbent)
| style="text-align:right;" | 44,482
| style="text-align:right;" | 40.8
|-
|- class="vcard"
| style="background-color: #E81B23; width: 2px;" |
| class="org" style="width: 130px" | Republican
| class="fn"    | Tim Donnelly
| style="text-align:right;" | 24,933
| style="text-align:right;" | 22.8
|-
|- class="vcard"
| style="background-color: #3333FF; width: 2px;" |
| class="org" style="width: 130px" | Democratic
| class="fn"    | Marjorie "Marge" Doyle
| style="text-align:right;" | 23,675
| style="text-align:right;" | 21.7
|-
|- class="vcard"
| style="background-color: #3333FF; width: 2px;" |
| class="org" style="width: 130px" | Democratic
| class="fn"    | Rita Ramirez
| style="text-align:right;" | 10,990
| style="text-align:right;" | 10.1
|-
|- class="vcard"
| style="background-color: #3333FF; width: 2px;" |
| class="org" style="width: 130px" | Democratic
| class="fn"    | Ronald J. O'Donnell
| style="text-align:right;" | 5,049
| style="text-align:right;" | 4.6
|-
|- class="vcard"
| style="background-color: #E81B23; width: 2px;" |
| class="org" style="width: 130px" | Republican
| class="fn"    | Joseph Napolitano (write-in)
| style="text-align:right;" | 0
| style="text-align:right;" | 0.0
|-

|- class="vcard"
| style="background-color: #E81B23; width: 5px;" |
| class="org" style="width: 130px" | Republican 
| class="fn" | Paul Cook (incumbent) 
| style="text-align: right; margin-right: 0.5em" |  
| style="text-align: right; margin-right: 0.5em" | 60.0 
|-

District 9 

The 9th district is based in the Central Valley and includes the San Joaquin Delta and Stockton. Democrat Jerry McNerney, who had represented the 9th district since 2013 and previously represented the 11th district from 2007 to 2013, won re-election.

|- class="vcard"
| style="background-color: #3333FF; width: 2px;" |
| class="org" style="width: 130px" | Democratic
| class="fn"    | Jerry McNerney (incumbent)
| style="text-align:right;" | 55,923
| style="text-align:right;" | 53.2
|-
|- class="vcard"
| style="background-color: #E81B23; width: 2px;" |
| class="org" style="width: 130px" | Republican
| class="fn"    | Marla Livengood
| style="text-align:right;" | 43,242
| style="text-align:right;" | 41.1
|-
|- class="vcard"
| style="background-color: ; width: 2px;" |
| class="org" style="width: 130px" | American Independent
| class="fn"    | Mike Tsarnas
| style="text-align:right;" | 6,038
| style="text-align:right;" | 5.7
|-

|- class="vcard"
| style="background-color: #3333FF; width: 5px;" |
| class="org" style="width: 130px" | Democratic 
| class="fn" | Jerry McNerney (incumbent) 
| style="text-align: right; margin-right: 0.5em" |  
| style="text-align: right; margin-right: 0.5em" | 56.5 
|-
|- class="vcard"
| style="background-color: #E81B23; width: 2px;" |
| class="org" style="width: 130px" | Republican
| class="fn"    | Marla Livengood
| style="text-align:right;" | 87,349
| style="text-align:right;" | 43.5
|-

Endorsements

District 10 

The 10th district was based in the Central Valley and included Modesto (and the remainder of Stanislaus County), Manteca, and Tracy (with other portions of southern San Joaquin County). Republican Jeff Denham, who had represented the 10th district since 2013 and previously represented the 19th district from 2011 to 2013, lost re-election to Democrat Josh Harder.

|- class="vcard"
| style="background-color: #E81B23; width: 2px;" |
| class="org" style="width: 130px" | Republican
| class="fn"    | Jeff Denham (incumbent)
| style="text-align:right;" | 45,719
| style="text-align:right;" | 37.5
|-
|- class="vcard"
| style="background-color: #3333FF; width: 2px;" |
| class="org" style="width: 130px" | Democratic
| class="fn"    | Josh Harder
| style="text-align:right;" | 20,742
| style="text-align:right;" | 17.0
|-
|- class="vcard"
| style="background-color: #E81B23; width: 2px;" |
| class="org" style="width: 130px" | Republican
| class="fn"    | Ted D. Howze
| style="text-align:right;" | 17,723
| style="text-align:right;" | 14.6
|-
|- class="vcard"
| style="background-color: #3333FF; width: 2px;" |
| class="org" style="width: 130px" | Democratic
| class="fn"    | Michael Eggman
| style="text-align:right;" | 12,446
| style="text-align:right;" | 10.2
|-
|- class="vcard"
| style="background-color: #3333FF; width: 2px;" |
| class="org" style="width: 130px" | Democratic
| class="fn"    | Virginia Madueño
| style="text-align:right;" | 11,178
| style="text-align:right;" | 9.2
|-
|- class="vcard"
| style="background-color: #3333FF; width: 2px;" |
| class="org" style="width: 130px" | Democratic
| class="fn"    | Sue Zwahlen
| style="text-align:right;" | 9,945
| style="text-align:right;" | 8.2
|-
|- class="vcard"
| style="background-color: #3333FF; width: 2px;" |
| class="org" style="width: 130px" | Democratic
| class="fn"    | Michael J. "Mike" Barkley
| style="text-align:right;" | 2,904
| style="text-align:right;" | 2.4
|-
|- class="vcard"
| style="background-color: #3333FF; width: 2px;" |
| class="org" style="width: 130px" | Democratic
| class="fn"    | Dotty Nygard (withdrawn)
| style="text-align:right;" | 1,100
| style="text-align:right;" | 0.9
|-

|- class="vcard"
| style="background-color: #3333FF; width: 5px;" |
| class="org" style="width: 130px" | Democratic 
| class="fn" | Josh Harder 
| style="text-align: right; margin-right: 0.5em" |  
| style="text-align: right; margin-right: 0.5em" | 52.3 
|-
|- class="vcard"
| style="background-color: #E81B23; width: 2px;" |
| class="org" style="width: 130px" | Republican
| class="fn"    | Jeff Denham (incumbent)
| style="text-align:right;" | 105,955
| style="text-align:right;" | 47.7
|-

Harder won both counties. Blue represents counties won by Harder.

Endorsements

Debates
Complete video of debate, September 30, 2018

Polling

Primary election

General election

District 11 

The 11th district is based in the East Bay and includes Concord and Richmond. Democrat Mark DeSaulnier, who had represented the 11th district since 2015, won re-election.

|- class="vcard"
| style="background-color: #3333FF; width: 2px;" |
| class="org" style="width: 130px" | Democratic
| class="fn"    | Mark DeSaulnier (incumbent)
| style="text-align:right;" | 107,115
| style="text-align:right;" | 68.3
|-
|- class="vcard"
| style="background-color: #E81B23; width: 2px;" |
| class="org" style="width: 130px" | Republican
| class="fn"    | John Fitzgerald
| style="text-align:right;" | 36,279
| style="text-align:right;" | 23.1
|-
|- class="vcard"
| style="background-color: #3333FF; width: 2px;" |
| class="org" style="width: 130px" | Democratic
| class="fn"    | Dennis Lytton
| style="text-align:right;" | 8,695
| style="text-align:right;" | 5.5
|-
|- class="vcard"
| style="background-color: #DDDDDD; width: 2px;" |
| class="org" style="width: 130px" | No party preference
| class="fn"    | Chris Wood
| style="text-align:right;" | 4,789
| style="text-align:right;" | 3.1
|-

|- class="vcard"
| style="background-color: #3333FF; width: 5px;" |
| class="org" style="width: 130px" | Democratic 
| class="fn" | Mark DeSaulnier (incumbent) 
| style="text-align: right; margin-right: 0.5em" |  
| style="text-align: right; margin-right: 0.5em" | 74.1 
|-
|- class="vcard"
| style="background-color: #E81B23; width: 2px;" |
| class="org" style="width: 130px" | Republican
| class="fn"    | John Fitzgerald
| style="text-align:right;" | 71,312
| style="text-align:right;" | 25.9
|-

Endorsements

District 12 

The 12th district is based in the Bay Area and includes most of San Francisco. House Democratic Leader and former Speaker Nancy Pelosi, who had represented the 12th district since 2013 and previously represented the 8th district from 1993 to 2013 and the 5th district from 1987 until 1993, won re-election.

|- class="vcard"
| style="background-color: #3333FF; width: 2px;" |
| class="org" style="width: 130px" | Democratic
| class="fn"    | Nancy Pelosi (incumbent)
| style="text-align:right;" | 141,365
| style="text-align:right;" | 68.5
|-
|- class="vcard"
| style="background-color: #E81B23; width: 2px;" |
| class="org" style="width: 130px" | Republican
| class="fn"    | Lisa Remmer
| style="text-align:right;" | 18,771
| style="text-align:right;" | 9.1
|-
|- class="vcard"
| style="background-color: #3333FF; width: 2px;" |
| class="org" style="width: 130px" | Democratic
| class="fn"    | Shahid Buttar
| style="text-align:right;" | 17,597
| style="text-align:right;" | 8.5
|-
|- class="vcard"
| style="background-color: #3333FF; width: 2px;" |
| class="org" style="width: 130px" | Democratic
| class="fn"    | Stephen Jaffe
| style="text-align:right;" | 12,114
| style="text-align:right;" | 5.9
|-
|- class="vcard"
| style="background-color: #3333FF; width: 2px;" |
| class="org" style="width: 130px" | Democratic
| class="fn"    | Ryan A. Khojasteh
| style="text-align:right;" | 9,498
| style="text-align:right;" | 4.6
|-
|- class="vcard"
| style="background-color: #17aa5c; width: 2px;" |
| class="org" style="width: 130px" | Green
| class="fn"    | Barry Hermanson
| style="text-align:right;" | 4,217
| style="text-align:right;" | 2.0
|-
|- class="vcard"
| style="background-color: #DDDDDD; width: 2px;" |
| class="org" style="width: 130px" | No party preference
| class="fn"    | Michael Goldstein
| style="text-align:right;" | 2,820
| style="text-align:right;" | 1.4
|-

|- class="vcard"
| style="background-color: #3333FF; width: 5px;" |
| class="org" style="width: 130px" | Democratic 
| class="fn" | Nancy Pelosi (incumbent) 
| style="text-align: right; margin-right: 0.5em" |  
| style="text-align: right; margin-right: 0.5em" | 86.8 
|-

Endorsements

District 13 

The 13th district is based in the East Bay and includes Berkeley and Oakland. Democrat Barbara Lee, who had represented the 13th district since 2013 and previously represented the 9th district from 1998 to 2013, won re-election.

|- class="vcard"
| style="background-color: #3333FF; width: 2px;" |
| class="org" style="width: 130px" | Democratic
| class="fn"    | Barbara Lee (incumbent)
| style="text-align:right;" | 159,751
| style="text-align:right;" | 99.3
|-
|- class="vcard"
| style="background-color: #17aa5c; width: 2px;" |
| class="org" style="width: 130px" | Green
| class="fn"    | Laura Wells (write-in)
| style="text-align:right;" | 832
| style="text-align:right;" | 0.5
|-
|- class="vcard"
| style="background-color: #E81B23; width: 2px;" |
| class="org" style="width: 130px" | Republican
| class="fn"    | Jeanne Marie Solnordal (write-in)
| style="text-align:right;" | 178
| style="text-align:right;" | 0.1
|-
|- class="vcard"
| style="background-color: #FED105; width: 2px;" |
| class="org" style="width: 130px" | Libertarian
| class="fn"    | James M. Eyer (write-in)
| style="text-align:right;" | 39
| style="text-align:right;" | 0.0
|-
|- class="vcard"
| style="background-color: #DDDDDD; width: 2px;" |
| class="org" style="width: 130px" | No party preference
| class="fn"    | Lanenna Joiner (write-in)
| style="text-align:right;" | 26
| style="text-align:right;" | 0.0
|-
|- class="vcard"
| style="background-color: ; width: 2px;" |
| class="org" style="width: 130px" | American Independent
| class="fn"    | Vincent May (write-in)
| style="text-align:right;" | 3
| style="text-align:right;" | 0.0
|-

|- class="vcard"
| style="background-color: #3333FF; width: 5px;" |
| class="org" style="width: 130px" | Democratic 
| class="fn" | Barbara Lee (incumbent) 
| style="text-align: right; margin-right: 0.5em" |  
| style="text-align: right; margin-right: 0.5em" | 88.4 
|-

Endorsements

District 14 

The 14th district is based in the Bay Area and includes most of San Mateo County. Democrat Jackie Speier, who had represented the 14th district since 2013 and previously represented the 12th district from 2008 to 2013, won re-election.

|- class="vcard"
| style="background-color: #3333FF; width: 2px;" |
| class="org" style="width: 130px" | Democratic
| class="fn"    | Jackie Speier (incumbent)
| style="text-align:right;" | 123,900
| style="text-align:right;" | 79.4
|-
|- class="vcard"
| style="background-color: #E81B23; width: 2px;" |
| class="org" style="width: 130px" | Republican
| class="fn"    | Cristina Osmeña
| style="text-align:right;" | 32,054
| style="text-align:right;" | 20.6
|-

|- class="vcard"
| style="background-color: #3333FF; width: 5px;" |
| class="org" style="width: 130px" | Democratic 
| class="fn" | Jackie Speier (incumbent) 
| style="text-align: right; margin-right: 0.5em" |  
| style="text-align: right; margin-right: 0.5em" | 79.2 
|-
|- class="vcard"
| style="background-color: #E81B23; width: 2px;" |
| class="org" style="width: 130px" | Republican
| class="fn"    | Cristina Osmeña
| style="text-align:right;" | 55,439
| style="text-align:right;" | 20.8
|-

Endorsements

District 15 

The 15th district is based in the East Bay and includes Hayward and Livermore. Democrat Eric Swalwell, who had represented the 15th district since 2013, won re-election.

|- class="vcard"
| style="background-color: #3333FF; width: 2px;" |
| class="org" style="width: 130px" | Democratic
| class="fn"    | Eric Swalwell (incumbent)
| style="text-align:right;" | 90,971
| style="text-align:right;" | 70.5
|-
|- class="vcard"
| style="background-color: #E81B23; width: 2px;" |
| class="org" style="width: 130px" | Republican
| class="fn"    | Rudy Peters
| style="text-align:right;" | 33,771
| style="text-align:right;" | 26.2
|-
|- class="vcard"
| style="background-color: #DDDDDD; width: 2px;" |
| class="org" style="width: 130px" | No party preference
| class="fn"    | Brendan St. John
| style="text-align:right;" | 4,322
| style="text-align:right;" | 3.3
|-

|- class="vcard"
| style="background-color: #3333FF; width: 5px;" |
| class="org" style="width: 130px" | Democratic 
| class="fn" | Eric Swalwell (incumbent) 
| style="text-align: right; margin-right: 0.5em" |  
| style="text-align: right; margin-right: 0.5em" | 73.0 
|-
|- class="vcard"
| style="background-color: #E81B23; width: 2px;" |
| class="org" style="width: 130px" | Republican
| class="fn"    | Rudy Peters
| style="text-align:right;" | 65,940
| style="text-align:right;" | 27.0
|-

Endorsements

District 16 

The 16th district is based in the Central Valley and includes Fresno, Madera, and Merced. Democrat Jim Costa, who had represented the 16th district since 2013 and previously represented the 20th district from 2005 to 2013, won re-election.

|- class="vcard"
| style="background-color: #3333FF; width: 2px;" |
| class="org" style="width: 130px" | Democratic
| class="fn"    | Jim Costa (incumbent)
| style="text-align:right;" | 39,527
| style="text-align:right;" | 53.0
|-
|- class="vcard"
| style="background-color: #E81B23; width: 2px;" |
| class="org" style="width: 130px" | Republican
| class="fn"    | Elizabeth Heng
| style="text-align:right;" | 35,080
| style="text-align:right;" | 47.0
|-

|- class="vcard"
| style="background-color: #3333FF; width: 5px;" |
| class="org" style="width: 130px" | Democratic 
| class="fn" | Jim Costa (incumbent) 
| style="text-align: right; margin-right: 0.5em" |  
| style="text-align: right; margin-right: 0.5em" | 57.5 
|-
|- class="vcard"
| style="background-color: #E81B23; width: 2px;" |
| class="org" style="width: 130px" | Republican
| class="fn"    | Elizabeth Heng
| style="text-align:right;" | 60,693
| style="text-align:right;" | 42.5
|-

Polling

District 17 

The 17th district is based in the Bay Area and includes Sunnyvale, Cupertino, Santa Clara, Fremont, and Milpitas. Democrat Ro Khanna, who had represented the 17th district since 2017, won re-election.

|- class="vcard"
| style="background-color: #3333FF; width: 2px;" |
| class="org" style="width: 130px" | Democratic
| class="fn"    | Ro Khanna (incumbent)
| style="text-align:right;" | 72,676
| style="text-align:right;" | 62.0
|-
|- class="vcard"
| style="background-color: #E81B23; width: 2px;" |
| class="org" style="width: 130px" | Republican
| class="fn"    | Ron Cohen
| style="text-align:right;" | 26,865
| style="text-align:right;" | 22.9
|-
|- class="vcard"
| style="background-color: #3333FF; width: 2px;" |
| class="org" style="width: 130px" | Democratic
| class="fn"    | Khanh Tran
| style="text-align:right;" | 8,455
| style="text-align:right;" | 7.2
|-
|- class="vcard"
| style="background-color: #3333FF; width: 2px;" |
| class="org" style="width: 130px" | Democratic
| class="fn"    | Stephen Forbes
| style="text-align:right;" | 6,259
| style="text-align:right;" | 5.3
|-
|- class="vcard"
| style="background-color: #FED105; width: 2px;" |
| class="org" style="width: 130px" | Libertarian
| class="fn"    | Kennita Watson
| style="text-align:right;" | 2,997
| style="text-align:right;" | 2.6
|-

|- class="vcard"
| style="background-color: #3333FF; width: 5px;" |
| class="org" style="width: 130px" | Democratic 
| class="fn" | Ro Khanna (incumbent) 
| style="text-align: right; margin-right: 0.5em" |  
| style="text-align: right; margin-right: 0.5em" | 75.3 
|-
|- class="vcard"
| style="background-color: #E81B23; width: 2px;" |
| class="org" style="width: 130px" | Republican
| class="fn"    | Ron Cohen
| style="text-align:right;" | 52,057
| style="text-align:right;" | 24.7
|-

Endorsements

District 18 

The 18th district is based in the Bay Area and includes Palo Alto, Redwood City, and Saratoga. Democrat Anna Eshoo, who had represented the 18th district since 2013 and previously represented the 14th district from 1993 to 2013, won re-election.

|- class="vcard"
| style="background-color: #3333FF; width: 2px;" |
| class="org" style="width: 130px" | Democratic
| class="fn"    | Anna Eshoo (incumbent)
| style="text-align:right;" | 133,993
| style="text-align:right;" | 73.4
|-
|- class="vcard"
| style="background-color: #E81B23; width: 2px;" |
| class="org" style="width: 130px" | Republican
| class="fn"    | Christine Russell
| style="text-align:right;" | 42,692
| style="text-align:right;" | 23.4
|-
|- class="vcard"
| style="background-color: #DDDDDD; width: 2px;" |
| class="org" style="width: 130px" | No party preference
| class="fn"    | John Karl Fredrich
| style="text-align:right;" | 5,803
| style="text-align:right;" | 3.2
|-

|- class="vcard"
| style="background-color: #3333FF; width: 5px;" |
| class="org" style="width: 130px" | Democratic 
| class="fn" | Anna Eshoo (incumbent) 
| style="text-align: right; margin-right: 0.5em" |  
| style="text-align: right; margin-right: 0.5em" | 74.5 
|-
|- class="vcard"
| style="background-color: #E81B23; width: 2px;" |
| class="org" style="width: 130px" | Republican
| class="fn"    | Christine Russell
| style="text-align:right;" | 77,096
| style="text-align:right;" | 25.5
|-

Endorsements

District 19 

The 19th district is based in the South Bay and includes most of San Jose. Democrat Zoe Lofgren, who had represented the 19th district since 2013 and previously represented the 16th district from 1995 to 2013, won re-election.

|- class="vcard"
| style="background-color: #3333FF; width: 2px;" |
| class="org" style="width: 130px" | Democratic
| class="fn"    | Zoe Lofgren (incumbent)
| style="text-align:right;" | 97,096
| style="text-align:right;" | 99.0
|-
|- class="vcard"
| style="background-color: #E81B23; width: 2px;" |
| class="org" style="width: 130px" | Republican
| class="fn"    | Justin James Aguilera (write-in)
| style="text-align:right;" | 792
| style="text-align:right;" | 0.8
|-
|- class="vcard"
| style="background-color: #E81B23; width: 2px;" |
| class="org" style="width: 130px" | Republican
| class="fn"    | Karl Ryan (write-in)
| style="text-align:right;" | 160
| style="text-align:right;" | 0.2
|-
|- class="vcard"
| style="background-color: ; width: 2px;" |
| class="org" style="width: 130px" | American Independent
| class="fn"    | Robert Ornelas (write-in)
| style="text-align:right;" | 7
| style="text-align:right;" | 0.0
|-

|- class="vcard"
| style="background-color: #3333FF; width: 5px;" |
| class="org" style="width: 130px" | Democratic 
| class="fn" | Zoe Lofgren (incumbent) 
| style="text-align: right; margin-right: 0.5em" |  
| style="text-align: right; margin-right: 0.5em" | 73.8 
|-
|- class="vcard"
| style="background-color: #E81B23; width: 2px;" |
| class="org" style="width: 130px" | Republican
| class="fn"    | Justin James Aguilera
| style="text-align:right;" | 57,823
| style="text-align:right;" | 26.2
|-

Endorsements

District 20 

The 20th district is based in the Central Coast and includes Monterey and Santa Cruz. Democrat Jimmy Panetta, who had represented the 20th district since 2017, won re-election.

|- class="vcard"
| style="background-color: #3333FF; width: 2px;" |
| class="org" style="width: 130px" | Democratic
| class="fn"    | Jimmy Panetta (incumbent)
| style="text-align:right;" | 102,828
| style="text-align:right;" | 80.7
|-
|- class="vcard"
| style="background-color: #DDDDDD; width: 2px;" |
| class="org" style="width: 130px" | No party preference
| class="fn"    | Ronald Paul Kabat
| style="text-align:right;" | 19,657
| style="text-align:right;" | 15.4
|-
|- class="vcard"
| style="background-color: #3333FF; width: 2px;" |
| class="org" style="width: 130px" | Democratic
| class="fn"    | Douglas Deitch
| style="text-align:right;" | 4,956
| style="text-align:right;" | 3.9
|-
|- class="vcard"
| style="background-color: #E81B23; width: 2px;" |
| class="org" style="width: 130px" | Republican
| class="fn"    | Casey K. Clark (write-in)
| style="text-align:right;" | 20
| style="text-align:right;" | 0.0
|-

|- class="vcard"
| style="background-color: #3333FF; width: 5px;" |
| class="org" style="width: 130px" | Democratic 
| class="fn" | Jimmy Panetta (incumbent) 
| style="text-align: right; margin-right: 0.5em" |  
| style="text-align: right; margin-right: 0.5em" | 81.4 
|-
|- class="vcard"
| style="background-color: #DDDDDD; width: 2px;" |
| class="org" style="width: 130px" | No party preference
| class="fn"    | Ronald Paul Kabat
| style="text-align:right;" | 42,044
| style="text-align:right;" | 18.6
|-

District 21 

The 21st district is based in the Central Valley and includes Hanford and parts of Bakersfield. Republican David Valadao, who had represented the 21st district since 2013, narrowly lost re-election to Democrat TJ Cox.
Cox was running in the 10th district race before switching to run in the 21st district in March 2017. Democrat Emilio Huerta, who ran for the seat in 2016 and was planning to run again, dropped out shortly before Cox entered the race.

|- class="vcard"
| style="background-color: #E81B23; width: 2px;" |
| class="org" style="width: 130px" | Republican
| class="fn"    | David Valadao (incumbent)
| style="text-align:right;" | 34,290
| style="text-align:right;" | 62.8
|-
|- class="vcard"
| style="background-color: #3333FF; width: 2px;" |
| class="org" style="width: 130px" | Democratic
| class="fn"    | TJ Cox
| style="text-align:right;" | 20,293
| style="text-align:right;" | 37.2
|-

|- class="vcard"
| style="background-color: #3333FF; width: 5px;" |
| class="org" style="width: 130px" | Democratic 
| class="fn" | TJ Cox 
| style="text-align: right; margin-right: 0.5em" |  
| style="text-align: right; margin-right: 0.5em" | 50.4 
|-
|- class="vcard"
| style="background-color: #E81B23; width: 2px;" |
| class="org" style="width: 130px" | Republican
| class="fn"    | David Valadao (incumbent)
| style="text-align:right;" | 56,377
| style="text-align:right;" | 49.6
|-

Blue represents counties won by Cox. Red represents counties won by Valadao.

Endorsements

Polling

District 22 

The 22nd district is based in the Central Valley and includes Clovis, Tulare, and Visalia. Republican Devin Nunes, who had represented the 22nd district since 2013 and previously represented the 21st district from 2003 to 2013, won re-election.

|- class="vcard"
| style="background-color: #E81B23; width: 2px;" |
| class="org" style="width: 130px" | Republican
| class="fn"    | Devin Nunes (incumbent)
| style="text-align:right;" | 70,112
| style="text-align:right;" | 57.6
|-
|- class="vcard"
| style="background-color: #3333FF; width: 2px;" |
| class="org" style="width: 130px" | Democratic
| class="fn"    | Andrew Janz
| style="text-align:right;" | 38,596
| style="text-align:right;" | 31.7
|-
|- class="vcard"
| style="background-color: #3333FF; width: 2px;" |
| class="org" style="width: 130px" | Democratic
| class="fn"    | Bobby Bliatout
| style="text-align:right;" | 6,002
| style="text-align:right;" | 4.9
|-
|- class="vcard"
| style="background-color: #3333FF; width: 2px;" |
| class="org" style="width: 130px" | Democratic
| class="fn"    | Ricardo "Rico" Franco
| style="text-align:right;" | 4,365
| style="text-align:right;" | 3.6
|-
|- class="vcard"
| style="background-color: #DDDDDD; width: 2px;" |
| class="org" style="width: 130px" | No party preference
| class="fn"    | Brian Carroll
| style="text-align:right;" | 1,591
| style="text-align:right;" | 1.3
|-
|- class="vcard"
| style="background-color: #FED105; width: 2px;" |
| class="org" style="width: 130px" | Libertarian
| class="fn"    | Bill Merryman
| style="text-align:right;" | 1,137
| style="text-align:right;" | 0.9
|-

|- class="vcard"
| style="background-color: #E81B23; width: 5px;" |
| class="org" style="width: 130px" | Republican 
| class="fn" | Devin Nunes (incumbent) 
| style="text-align: right; margin-right: 0.5em" |  
| style="text-align: right; margin-right: 0.5em" | 52.8 
|-
|- class="vcard"
| style="background-color: #3333FF; width: 2px;" |
| class="org" style="width: 130px" | Democratic
| class="fn"    | Andrew Janz
| style="text-align:right;" | 105,136
| style="text-align:right;" | 47.2
|-

Endorsements

Polling

District 23 

The 23rd district is based in the southern Central Valley and includes parts of Bakersfield. Republican House Majority Leader Kevin McCarthy, who had represented the 23rd district since 2013 and previously represented the 22nd district from 2007 to 2013, won re-election.

|- class="vcard"
| style="background-color: #E81B23; width: 2px;" |
| class="org" style="width: 130px" | Republican
| class="fn"    | Kevin McCarthy (incumbent)
| style="text-align:right;" | 81,633
| style="text-align:right;" | 68.8
|-
|- class="vcard"
| style="background-color: #3333FF; width: 2px;" |
| class="org" style="width: 130px" | Democratic
| class="fn"    | Tatiana Matta
| style="text-align:right;" | 14,935
| style="text-align:right;" | 12.6
|-
|- class="vcard"
| style="background-color: #3333FF; width: 2px;" |
| class="org" style="width: 130px" | Democratic
| class="fn"    | Wendy Reed
| style="text-align:right;" | 11,974
| style="text-align:right;" | 10.1
|-
|- class="vcard"
| style="background-color: #3333FF; width: 2px;" |
| class="org" style="width: 130px" | Democratic
| class="fn"    | Mary Helen Barro
| style="text-align:right;" | 6,363
| style="text-align:right;" | 5.4
|-
|- class="vcard"
| style="background-color: #DDDDDD; width: 2px;" |
| class="org" style="width: 130px" | No party preference
| class="fn"    | James Davis
| style="text-align:right;" | 2,076
| style="text-align:right;" | 1.7
|-
|- class="vcard"
| style="background-color: #3333FF; width: 2px;" |
| class="org" style="width: 130px" | Democratic
| class="fn"    | Kurtis Wilson
| style="text-align:right;" | 1,691
| style="text-align:right;" | 1.4
|-

|- class="vcard"
| style="background-color: #E81B23; width: 5px;" |
| class="org" style="width: 130px" | Republican 
| class="fn" | Kevin McCarthy (incumbent) 
| style="text-align: right; margin-right: 0.5em" |  
| style="text-align: right; margin-right: 0.5em" | 63.7 
|-
|- class="vcard"
| style="background-color: #3333FF; width: 2px;" |
| class="org" style="width: 130px" | Democratic
| class="fn"    | Tatiana Matta
| style="text-align:right;" | 74,661
| style="text-align:right;" | 36.3
|-

District 24 

The 24th district is based in the Central Coast and includes San Luis Obispo and Santa Barbara counties. Democrat Salud Carbajal, who had represented the 24th district since 2017, won re-election.

|- class="vcard"
| style="background-color: #3333FF; width: 2px;" |
| class="org" style="width: 130px" | Democratic
| class="fn"    | Salud Carbajal (incumbent)
| style="text-align:right;" | 94,558
| style="text-align:right;" | 53.6
|-
|- class="vcard"
| style="background-color: #E81B23; width: 2px;" |
| class="org" style="width: 130px" | Republican
| class="fn"    | Justin Fareed
| style="text-align:right;" | 64,177
| style="text-align:right;" | 36.4
|-
|- class="vcard"
| style="background-color: #E81B23; width: 2px;" |
| class="org" style="width: 130px" | Republican
| class="fn"    | Michael Erin Woody
| style="text-align:right;" | 17,715
| style="text-align:right;" | 10.0
|-

|- class="vcard"
| style="background-color: #3333FF; width: 5px;" |
| class="org" style="width: 130px" | Democratic 
| class="fn" | Salud Carbajal (incumbent) 
| style="text-align: right; margin-right: 0.5em" |  
| style="text-align: right; margin-right: 0.5em" | 58.6 
|-
|- class="vcard"
| style="background-color: #E81B23; width: 2px;" |
| class="org" style="width: 130px" | Republican
| class="fn"    | Justin Fareed
| style="text-align:right;" | 117,881
| style="text-align:right;" | 41.4
|-

Endorsements

Polling

District 25 

The 25th district is based in northern Los Angeles County and includes Palmdale and Santa Clarita as well as Simi Valley in Ventura County. Republican Steve Knight, who had represented the 25th district since 2015, lost re-election to Democrat Katie Hill.

|- class="vcard"
| style="background-color: #E81B23; width: 2px;" |
| class="org" style="width: 130px" | Republican
| class="fn"    | Steve Knight (incumbent)
| style="text-align:right;" | 61,411
| style="text-align:right;" | 51.8
|-
|- class="vcard"
| style="background-color: #3333FF; width: 2px;" |
| class="org" style="width: 130px" | Democratic
| class="fn"    | Katie Hill
| style="text-align:right;" | 24,507
| style="text-align:right;" | 20.7
|-
|- class="vcard"
| style="background-color: #3333FF; width: 2px;" |
| class="org" style="width: 130px" | Democratic
| class="fn"    | Bryan Caforio
| style="text-align:right;" | 21,821
| style="text-align:right;" | 18.4
|-
|- class="vcard"
| style="background-color: #3333FF; width: 2px;" |
| class="org" style="width: 130px" | Democratic
| class="fn"    | Jess Phoenix
| style="text-align:right;" | 7,549
| style="text-align:right;" | 6.4
|-
|- class="vcard"
| style="background-color: #3333FF; width: 2px;" |
| class="org" style="width: 130px" | Democratic
| class="fn"    | Mary Pallant
| style="text-align:right;" | 3,157
| style="text-align:right;" | 2.7
|-

|- class="vcard"
| style="background-color: #3333FF; width: 5px;" |
| class="org" style="width: 130px" | Democratic 
| class="fn" | Katie Hill 
| style="text-align: right; margin-right: 0.5em" |  
| style="text-align: right; margin-right: 0.5em" | 54.4 
|-
|- class="vcard"
| style="background-color: #E81B23; width: 2px;" |
| class="org" style="width: 130px" | Republican
| class="fn"    | Steve Knight (incumbent)
| style="text-align:right;" | 111,813
| style="text-align:right;" | 45.6
|-

Blue represents counties won by Hill. Red represents counties won by Knight.

Endorsements

Polling

Primary election

General election

District 26 

The 26th district is based in the southern Central Coast and includes Oxnard and Thousand Oaks. Democrat Julia Brownley, who had represented the 26th district since 2013, won re-election.

|- class="vcard"
| style="background-color: #3333FF; width: 2px;" |
| class="org" style="width: 130px" | Democratic
| class="fn"    | Julia Brownley (incumbent)
| style="text-align:right;" | 72,764
| style="text-align:right;" | 54.1
|-
|- class="vcard"
| style="background-color: #E81B23; width: 2px;" |
| class="org" style="width: 130px" | Republican
| class="fn"    | Antonio Sabàto Jr.
| style="text-align:right;" | 30,107
| style="text-align:right;" | 22.4
|-
|- class="vcard"
| style="background-color: #E81B23; width: 2px;" |
| class="org" style="width: 130px" | Republican
| class="fn"    | Jeffrey Burum
| style="text-align:right;" | 26,656
| style="text-align:right;" | 19.8
|-
|- class="vcard"
| style="background-color: #3333FF; width: 2px;" |
| class="org" style="width: 130px" | Democratic
| class="fn"    | John Nelson
| style="text-align:right;" | 4,959
| style="text-align:right;" | 3.7
|-

|- class="vcard"
| style="background-color: #3333FF; width: 5px;" |
| class="org" style="width: 130px" | Democratic 
| class="fn" | Julia Brownley (incumbent) 
| style="text-align: right; margin-right: 0.5em" |  
| style="text-align: right; margin-right: 0.5em" | 61.9 
|-
|- class="vcard"
| style="background-color: #E81B23; width: 2px;" |
| class="org" style="width: 130px" | Republican
| class="fn"    | Antonio Sabàto Jr.
| style="text-align:right;" | 97,210
| style="text-align:right;" | 38.1
|-

Endorsements

District 27 

The 27th district is based in the San Gabriel Foothills and includes Alhambra, Glendora and Pasadena. Democrat Judy Chu, who had represented the 27th district since 2013 and previously represented the 32nd district from 2009 to 2013, won re-election.

|- class="vcard"
| style="background-color: #3333FF; width: 2px;" |
| class="org" style="width: 130px" | Democratic
| class="fn"    | Judy Chu (incumbent)
| style="text-align:right;" | 86,932
| style="text-align:right;" | 83.5
|-
|- class="vcard"
| style="background-color: #3333FF; width: 2px;" |
| class="org" style="width: 130px" | Democratic
| class="fn"    | Bryan Witt
| style="text-align:right;" | 17,186
| style="text-align:right;" | 16.5
|-

|- class="vcard"
| style="background-color: #3333FF; width: 5px;" |
| class="org" style="width: 130px" | Democratic 
| class="fn" | Judy Chu (incumbent) 
| style="text-align: right; margin-right: 0.5em" |  
| style="text-align: right; margin-right: 0.5em" | 79.2 
|-
|- class="vcard"
| style="background-color: #3333FF; width: 2px;" |
| class="org" style="width: 130px" | Democratic
| class="fn"    | Bryan Witt
| style="text-align:right;" | 42,132
| style="text-align:right;" | 20.8
|-

Endorsements

District 28 

The 28th district is based in the northern Los Angeles suburbs and includes Burbank, Glendale, La Cañada Flintridge as well as parts of central Los Angeles. Democrat Adam Schiff, who had represented the 28th district since 2013 and previously represented the 29th district from 2003 to 2013 and the 27th district from 2001 to 2003, won re-election.

|- class="vcard"
| style="background-color: #3333FF; width: 2px;" |
| class="org" style="width: 130px" | Democratic
| class="fn"    | Adam Schiff (incumbent)
| style="text-align:right;" | 94,249
| style="text-align:right;" | 73.5
|-
|- class="vcard"
| style="background-color: #E81B23; width: 2px;" |
| class="org" style="width: 130px" | Republican
| class="fn"    | Johnny Nalbandian
| style="text-align:right;" | 26,566
| style="text-align:right;" | 20.7
|-
|- class="vcard"
| style="background-color: #3333FF; width: 2px;" |
| class="org" style="width: 130px" | Democratic
| class="fn"    | Sal Genovese
| style="text-align:right;" | 7,406
| style="text-align:right;" | 5.8
|-

|- class="vcard"
| style="background-color: #3333FF; width: 5px;" |
| class="org" style="width: 130px" | Democratic 
| class="fn" | Adam Schiff (incumbent) 
| style="text-align: right; margin-right: 0.5em" |  
| style="text-align: right; margin-right: 0.5em" | 78.4 
|-
|- class="vcard"
| style="background-color: #E81B23; width: 2px;" |
| class="org" style="width: 130px" | Republican
| class="fn"    | Johnny Nalbandian
| style="text-align:right;" | 54,272
| style="text-align:right;" | 21.6
|-

District 29 

The 29th district is based in the northeastern San Fernando Valley. Democrat Tony Cárdenas, who had represented the 29th district since 2013, won re-election.

|- class="vcard"
| style="background-color: #3333FF; width: 2px;" |
| class="org" style="width: 130px" | Democratic
| class="fn"    | Tony Cárdenas (incumbent)
| style="text-align:right;" | 43,579
| style="text-align:right;" | 66.7
|-
|- class="vcard"
| style="background-color: #E81B23; width: 2px;" |
| class="org" style="width: 130px" | Republican
| class="fn"    | Benito Benny Bernal
| style="text-align:right;" | 11,353
| style="text-align:right;" | 17.4
|-
|- class="vcard"
| style="background-color: #3333FF; width: 2px;" |
| class="org" style="width: 130px" | Democratic
| class="fn"    | Joseph "Joe" Shammas
| style="text-align:right;" | 5,278
| style="text-align:right;" | 8.1
|-
|- class="vcard"
| style="background-color: #17aa5c; width: 2px;" |
| class="org" style="width: 130px" | Green
| class="fn"    | Angelica Maria Dueñas
| style="text-align:right;" | 4,164
| style="text-align:right;" | 6.4
|-
|- class="vcard"
| style="background-color: #DDDDDD; width: 2px;" |
| class="org" style="width: 130px" | No party preference
| class="fn"    | Juan Rey
| style="text-align:right;" | 944
| style="text-align:right;" | 1.4
|-

|- class="vcard"
| style="background-color: #3333FF; width: 5px;" |
| class="org" style="width: 130px" | Democratic 
| class="fn" | Tony Cárdenas (incumbent) 
| style="text-align: right; margin-right: 0.5em" |  
| style="text-align: right; margin-right: 0.5em" | 80.6 
|-
|- class="vcard"
| style="background-color: #E81B23; width: 2px;" |
| class="org" style="width: 130px" | Republican
| class="fn"    | Benito Benny Bernal
| style="text-align:right;" | 29,995
| style="text-align:right;" | 19.4
|-

Endorsements

District 30 

The 30th district is based in the western San Fernando Valley and includes Sherman Oaks. Democrat Brad Sherman, who had represented the 30th district since 2013 and previously represented the 27th district from 2003 to 2013 and the 24th district from 1997 to 2003, won re-election.

|- class="vcard"
| style="background-color: #3333FF; width: 2px;" |
| class="org" style="width: 130px" | Democratic
| class="fn"    | Brad Sherman (incumbent)
| style="text-align:right;" | 80,038
| style="text-align:right;" | 62.3
|-
|- class="vcard"
| style="background-color: #E81B23; width: 2px;" |
| class="org" style="width: 130px" | Republican
| class="fn"    | Mark Reed
| style="text-align:right;" | 35,046
| style="text-align:right;" | 27.3
|-
|- class="vcard"
| style="background-color: #3333FF; width: 2px;" |
| class="org" style="width: 130px" | Democratic
| class="fn"    | Raji Rab
| style="text-align:right;" | 6,753
| style="text-align:right;" | 5.3
|-
|- class="vcard"
| style="background-color: #3333FF; width: 2px;" |
| class="org" style="width: 130px" | Democratic
| class="fn"    | Jon Pelzer
| style="text-align:right;" | 6,642
| style="text-align:right;" | 5.2
|-

|- class="vcard"
| style="background-color: #3333FF; width: 5px;" |
| class="org" style="width: 130px" | Democratic 
| class="fn" | Brad Sherman (incumbent) 
| style="text-align: right; margin-right: 0.5em" |  
| style="text-align: right; margin-right: 0.5em" | 73.4 
|-
|- class="vcard"
| style="background-color: #E81B23; width: 2px;" |
| class="org" style="width: 130px" | Republican
| class="fn"    | Mark Reed
| style="text-align:right;" | 69,420
| style="text-align:right;" | 26.6
|-

Endorsements

District 31 

The 31st district is based in the Inland Empire and includes San Bernardino, Redlands and Rancho Cucamonga. Democrat Pete Aguilar, who had represented the 31st district since 2015, won re-election.

|- class="vcard"
| style="background-color: #3333FF; width: 2px;" |
| class="org" style="width: 130px" | Democratic
| class="fn"    | Pete Aguilar (incumbent)
| style="text-align:right;" | 41,337
| style="text-align:right;" | 45.9
|-
|- class="vcard"
| style="background-color: #E81B23; width: 2px;" |
| class="org" style="width: 130px" | Republican
| class="fn"    | Sean Flynn
| style="text-align:right;" | 40,622
| style="text-align:right;" | 45.1
|-
|- class="vcard"
| style="background-color: #3333FF; width: 2px;" |
| class="org" style="width: 130px" | Democratic
| class="fn"    | Kaisar Ahmed
| style="text-align:right;" | 8,108
| style="text-align:right;" | 9.0
|-

|- class="vcard"
| style="background-color: #3333FF; width: 5px;" |
| class="org" style="width: 130px" | Democratic 
| class="fn" | Pete Aguilar (incumbent) 
| style="text-align: right; margin-right: 0.5em" |  
| style="text-align: right; margin-right: 0.5em" | 58.7 
|-
|- class="vcard"
| style="background-color: #E81B23; width: 2px;" |
| class="org" style="width: 130px" | Republican
| class="fn"    | Sean Flynn
| style="text-align:right;" | 77,352
| style="text-align:right;" | 41.3
|-

Endorsements

District 32 

The 32nd district is based in the San Gabriel Valley and includes El Monte and West Covina. Democrat Grace Napolitano, who had represented the 32nd district since 2013 and previously represented the 38th district from 2003 to 2013 and the 34th district from 1999 to 2003, won re-election.

|- class="vcard"
| style="background-color: #3333FF; width: 2px;" |
| class="org" style="width: 130px" | Democratic
| class="fn"    | Grace Napolitano (incumbent)
| style="text-align:right;" | 56,674
| style="text-align:right;" | 99.9
|-
|- class="vcard"
| style="background-color: #E81B23; width: 2px;" |
| class="org" style="width: 130px" | Republican
| class="fn"    | Joshua M. Scott (write-in)
| style="text-align:right;" | 42
| style="text-align:right;" | 0.1
|-
|- class="vcard"
| style="background-color: #3333FF; width: 2px;" |
| class="org" style="width: 130px" | Democratic
| class="fn"    | Ricardo De La Fuente (write-in)
| style="text-align:right;" | 1
| style="text-align:right;" | 0.0
|-

|- class="vcard"
| style="background-color: #3333FF; width: 5px;" |
| class="org" style="width: 130px" | Democratic 
| class="fn" | Grace Napolitano (incumbent) 
| style="text-align: right; margin-right: 0.5em" |  
| style="text-align: right; margin-right: 0.5em" | 68.8 
|-
|- class="vcard"
| style="background-color: #E81B23; width: 2px;" |
| class="org" style="width: 130px" | Republican
| class="fn"    | Joshua M. Scott
| style="text-align:right;" | 55,272
| style="text-align:right;" | 31.2
|-

District 33 

The 33rd district is based in coastal Los Angeles County and includes Beverly Hills and Santa Monica. Democrat Ted Lieu, who had represented the 33rd district since 2015, won re-election.

|- class="vcard"
| style="background-color: #3333FF; width: 2px;" |
| class="org" style="width: 130px" | Democratic
| class="fn"    | Ted Lieu (incumbent)
| style="text-align:right;" | 100,581
| style="text-align:right;" | 61.7
|-
|- class="vcard"
| style="background-color: #E81B23; width: 2px;" |
| class="org" style="width: 130px" | Republican
| class="fn"    | Kenneth Wright
| style="text-align:right;" | 48,985
| style="text-align:right;" | 30.1
|-
|- class="vcard"
| style="background-color: #3333FF; width: 2px;" |
| class="org" style="width: 130px" | Democratic
| class="fn"    | Emory Rodgers
| style="text-align:right;" | 13,435
| style="text-align:right;" | 8.2
|-

|- class="vcard"
| style="background-color: #3333FF; width: 5px;" |
| class="org" style="width: 130px" | Democratic 
| class="fn" | Ted Lieu (incumbent) 
| style="text-align: right; margin-right: 0.5em" |  
| style="text-align: right; margin-right: 0.5em" | 70.0 
|-
|- class="vcard"
| style="background-color: #E81B23; width: 2px;" |
| class="org" style="width: 130px" | Republican
| class="fn"    | Kenneth Wright
| style="text-align:right;" | 93,769
| style="text-align:right;" | 30.0
|-

District 34 

The 34th district is based in central Los Angeles and includes Boyle Heights, Chinatown and Downtown Los Angeles. Democrat Jimmy Gomez, who had represented the 34th district since 2017, won re-election.

|- class="vcard"
| style="background-color: #3333FF; width: 2px;" |
| class="org" style="width: 130px" | Democratic
| class="fn"    | Jimmy Gomez (incumbent)
| style="text-align:right;" | 54,661
| style="text-align:right;" | 78.7
|-
|- class="vcard"
| style="background-color: #17aa5c; width: 2px;" |
| class="org" style="width: 130px" | Green
| class="fn"    | Kenneth Mejia
| style="text-align:right;" | 8,987
| style="text-align:right;" | 12.9
|-
|- class="vcard"
| style="background-color: #FED105; width: 2px;" |
| class="org" style="width: 130px" | Libertarian
| class="fn"    | Angela Elise McArdle
| style="text-align:right;" | 5,804
| style="text-align:right;" | 8.4
|-

|- class="vcard"
| style="background-color: #3333FF; width: 5px;" |
| class="org" style="width: 130px" | Democratic 
| class="fn" | Jimmy Gomez (incumbent) 
| style="text-align: right; margin-right: 0.5em" |  
| style="text-align: right; margin-right: 0.5em" | 72.5 
|-
|- class="vcard"
| style="background-color: #17aa5c; width: 2px;" |
| class="org" style="width: 130px" | Green
| class="fn"    | Kenneth Mejia
| style="text-align:right;" | 41,711
| style="text-align:right;" | 27.5
|-

Endorsements

District 35 

The 35th district is based in the Inland Empire and includes Fontana, Ontario, and Pomona. Democrat Norma Torres, who had represented the 35th district since 2015, won re-election.

|- class="vcard"
| style="background-color: #3333FF; width: 2px;" |
| class="org" style="width: 130px" | Democratic
| class="fn"    | Norma Torres (incumbent)
| style="text-align:right;" | 32,474
| style="text-align:right;" | 51.2
|-
|- class="vcard"
| style="background-color: #E81B23; width: 2px;" |
| class="org" style="width: 130px" | Republican
| class="fn"    | Christian Valiente
| style="text-align:right;" | 21,572
| style="text-align:right;" | 34.0
|-
|- class="vcard"
| style="background-color: #3333FF; width: 2px;" |
| class="org" style="width: 130px" | Democratic
| class="fn"    | Joe Baca
| style="text-align:right;" | 9,417
| style="text-align:right;" | 14.7
|-

|- class="vcard"
| style="background-color: #3333FF; width: 5px;" |
| class="org" style="width: 130px" | Democratic 
| class="fn" | Norma Torres (incumbent) 
| style="text-align: right; margin-right: 0.5em" |  
| style="text-align: right; margin-right: 0.5em" | 69.4 
|-
|- class="vcard"
| style="background-color: #E81B23; width: 2px;" |
| class="org" style="width: 130px" | Republican
| class="fn"    | Christian Valiente
| style="text-align:right;" | 45,604
| style="text-align:right;" | 30.6
|-

District 36 

The 36th district is based in eastern Riverside County and includes Palm Springs. Democrat Raul Ruiz, who had represented the 36th district since 2013, won re-election.

|- class="vcard"
| style="background-color: #3333FF; width: 2px;" |
| class="org" style="width: 130px" | Democratic
| class="fn"    | Raul Ruiz (incumbent)
| style="text-align:right;" | 65,554
| style="text-align:right;" | 55.0
|-
|- class="vcard"
| style="background-color: #E81B23; width: 2px;" |
| class="org" style="width: 130px" | Republican
| class="fn"    | Kimberlin Brown Pelzer
| style="text-align:right;" | 27,648
| style="text-align:right;" | 23.2
|-
|- class="vcard"
| style="background-color: #E81B23; width: 2px;" |
| class="org" style="width: 130px" | Republican
| class="fn"    | Dan Ball
| style="text-align:right;" | 9,312
| style="text-align:right;" | 7.8
|-
|- class="vcard"
| style="background-color: #E81B23; width: 2px;" |
| class="org" style="width: 130px" | Republican
| class="fn"    | Douglas Hassett
| style="text-align:right;" | 6,001
| style="text-align:right;" | 5.0
|-
|- class="vcard"
| style="background-color: #E81B23; width: 2px;" |
| class="org" style="width: 130px" | Republican
| class="fn"    | Stephan J. Wolkowicz
| style="text-align:right;" | 5,576
| style="text-align:right;" | 4.7
|-
|- class="vcard"
| style="background-color: #E81B23; width: 2px;" |
| class="org" style="width: 130px" | Republican
| class="fn"    | Robert Bentley
| style="text-align:right;" | 5,030
| style="text-align:right;" | 4.2
|-

|- class="vcard"
| style="background-color: #3333FF; width: 5px;" |
| class="org" style="width: 130px" | Democratic 
| class="fn" | Raul Ruiz (incumbent) 
| style="text-align: right; margin-right: 0.5em" |  
| style="text-align: right; margin-right: 0.5em" | 59.0 
|-
|- class="vcard"
| style="background-color: #E81B23; width: 2px;" |
| class="org" style="width: 130px" | Republican
| class="fn"    | Kimberlin Brown Pelzer
| style="text-align:right;" | 84,839
| style="text-align:right;" | 41.0
|-

Endorsements

District 37 

The 37th district is based in South Los Angeles and includes Crenshaw, Exposition Park and Culver City. Democrat Karen Bass, who had represented the 37th district since 2013 and previously represented the 33rd district from 2011 to 2013, won re-election.

|- class="vcard"
| style="background-color: #3333FF; width: 2px;" |
| class="org" style="width: 130px" | Democratic
| class="fn"    | Karen Bass (incumbent)
| style="text-align:right;" | 99,118
| style="text-align:right;" | 89.2
|-
|- class="vcard"
| style="background-color: #E81B23; width: 2px;" |
| class="org" style="width: 130px" | Republican
| class="fn"    | Ron J. Bassilian
| style="text-align:right;" | 12,020
| style="text-align:right;" | 10.8
|-

|- class="vcard"
| style="background-color: #3333FF; width: 5px;" |
| class="org" style="width: 130px" | Democratic 
| class="fn" | Karen Bass (incumbent) 
| style="text-align: right; margin-right: 0.5em" |  
| style="text-align: right; margin-right: 0.5em" | 89.1 
|-
|- class="vcard"
| style="background-color: #E81B23; width: 2px;" |
| class="org" style="width: 130px" | Republican
| class="fn"    | Ron J. Bassilian
| style="text-align:right;" | 25,823
| style="text-align:right;" | 10.9
|-

Endorsements

District 38 

The 38th district is based in the eastern Los Angeles suburbs and includes Norwalk and Whittier. Democrat Linda Sánchez, who had represented the 38th district since 2013 and previously represented the 39th district from 2003 to 2013, won re-election.

|- class="vcard"
| style="background-color: #3333FF; width: 2px;" |
| class="org" style="width: 130px" | Democratic
| class="fn"    | Linda Sánchez (incumbent)
| style="text-align:right;" | 54,691
| style="text-align:right;" | 62.7
|-
|- class="vcard"
| style="background-color: #E81B23; width: 2px;" |
| class="org" style="width: 130px" | Republican
| class="fn"    | Ryan Downing
| style="text-align:right;" | 32,584
| style="text-align:right;" | 37.3
|-

|- class="vcard"
| style="background-color: #3333FF; width: 5px;" |
| class="org" style="width: 130px" | Democratic 
| class="fn" | Linda Sánchez (incumbent) 
| style="text-align: right; margin-right: 0.5em" |  
| style="text-align: right; margin-right: 0.5em" | 68.9 
|-
|- class="vcard"
| style="background-color: #E81B23; width: 2px;" |
| class="org" style="width: 130px" | Republican
| class="fn"    | Ryan Downing
| style="text-align:right;" | 62,968
| style="text-align:right;" | 31.1
|-

Endorsements

District 39 

The 39th district straddles the Los Angeles–Orange–San Bernardino tri-county border and includes Chino Hills, Diamond Bar, and Fullerton. Republican Ed Royce, who had represented the 39th district since 2013 and had represented the 40th district from 2003 to 2013 and the 39th district from 1993 to 2003, retired and was succeeded by Democrat Gil Cisneros.

|- class="vcard"
| style="background-color: #E81B23; width: 2px;" |
| class="org" style="width: 130px" | Republican
| class="fn"    | Young Kim
| style="text-align:right;" | 30,019
| style="text-align:right;" | 21.2
|-
|- class="vcard"
| style="background-color: #3333FF; width: 2px;" |
| class="org" style="width: 130px" | Democratic
| class="fn"    | Gil Cisneros
| style="text-align:right;" | 27,469
| style="text-align:right;" | 19.4
|-
|- class="vcard"
| style="background-color: #E81B23; width: 2px;" |
| class="org" style="width: 130px" | Republican
| class="fn"    | Phil Liberatore
| style="text-align:right;" | 20,257
| style="text-align:right;" | 14.3
|-
|- class="vcard"
| style="background-color: #3333FF; width: 2px;" |
| class="org" style="width: 130px" | Democratic
| class="fn"    | Andy Thorburn
| style="text-align:right;" | 12,990
| style="text-align:right;" | 9.2
|-
|- class="vcard"
| style="background-color: #E81B23; width: 2px;" |
| class="org" style="width: 130px" | Republican
| class="fn"    | Shawn Nelson
| style="text-align:right;" | 9,750
| style="text-align:right;" | 6.9
|-
|- class="vcard"
| style="background-color: #E81B23; width: 2px;" |
| class="org" style="width: 130px" | Republican
| class="fn"    | Bob Huff
| style="text-align:right;" | 8,699
| style="text-align:right;" | 6.2
|-
|- class="vcard"
| style="background-color: #3333FF; width: 2px;" |
| class="org" style="width: 130px" | Democratic
| class="fn"    | Sam Jammal
| style="text-align:right;" | 7,613
| style="text-align:right;" | 5.4
|-
|- class="vcard"
| style="background-color: #3333FF; width: 2px;" |
| class="org" style="width: 130px" | Democratic
| class="fn"    | Mai-Khanh Tran
| style="text-align:right;" | 7,430
| style="text-align:right;" | 5.3
|-
|- class="vcard"
| style="background-color: #3333FF; width: 2px;" |
| class="org" style="width: 130px" | Democratic
| class="fn"    | Herbert H. Lee
| style="text-align:right;" | 5,988
| style="text-align:right;" | 4.2
|-
|- class="vcard"
| style="background-color: #E81B23; width: 2px;" |
| class="org" style="width: 130px" | Republican
| class="fn"    | Steven C. Vargas
| style="text-align:right;" | 4,144
| style="text-align:right;" | 2.9
|-
|- class="vcard"
| style="background-color: #3333FF; width: 2px;" |
| class="org" style="width: 130px" | Democratic
| class="fn"    | Suzi Park Leggett
| style="text-align:right;" | 2,058
| style="text-align:right;" | 1.5
|-
|- class="vcard"
| style="background-color: #E81B23; width: 2px;" |
| class="org" style="width: 130px" | Republican
| class="fn"    | John J. Cullum
| style="text-align:right;" | 1,747
| style="text-align:right;" | 1.2
|-
|- class="vcard"
| style="background-color: #DDDDDD; width: 2px;" |
| class="org" style="width: 130px" | No party preference
| class="fn"    | Karen Lee Schatzle
| style="text-align:right;" | 903
| style="text-align:right;" | 0.6
|-
|- class="vcard"
| style="background-color: #DDDDDD; width: 2px;" |
| class="org" style="width: 130px" | No party preference
| class="fn"    | Steve Cox
| style="text-align:right;" | 856
| style="text-align:right;" | 0.6
|-
|- class="vcard"
| style="background-color: #E81B23; width: 2px;" |
| class="org" style="width: 130px" | Republican
| class="fn"    | Andrew Sarega
| style="text-align:right;" | 823
| style="text-align:right;" | 0.6
|-
|- class="vcard"
| style="background-color: ; width: 2px;" |
| class="org" style="width: 130px" | American Independent
| class="fn"    | Sophia J. Alexander
| style="text-align:right;" | 523
| style="text-align:right;" | 0.4
|-
|- class="vcard"
| style="background-color: ; width: 2px;" |
| class="org" style="width: 130px" | American Independent
| class="fn"    | Ted Alemayhu
| style="text-align:right;" | 176
| style="text-align:right;" | 0.1
|-

|- class="vcard"
| style="background-color: #3333FF; width: 5px;" |
| class="org" style="width: 130px" | Democratic 
| class="fn" | Gil Cisneros 
| style="text-align: right; margin-right: 0.5em" |  
| style="text-align: right; margin-right: 0.5em" | 51.6 
|-
|- class="vcard"
| style="background-color: #E81B23; width: 2px;" |
| class="org" style="width: 130px" | Republican
| class="fn"    | Young Kim
| style="text-align:right;" | 118,391
| style="text-align:right;" | 48.4
|-

Blue represents counties won by Cisneros. Red represents counties won by Kim.

Endorsements

Debates
Complete video of debate, October 16, 2018

Polling

Primary election

General election

District 40 

The 40th district is based in central Los Angeles County and includes Downey and East Los Angeles. Democrat Lucille Roybal-Allard, who had represented the 40th district since 2013 and previously represented the 34th district from 2003 to 2013 and the 33rd district from 1993 to 2003, won re-election.

|- class="vcard"
| style="background-color: #3333FF; width: 2px;" |
| class="org" style="width: 130px" | Democratic
| class="fn"    | Lucille Roybal-Allard (incumbent)
| style="text-align:right;" | 35,636
| style="text-align:right;" | 80.3
|-
|- class="vcard"
| style="background-color: #17aa5c; width: 2px;" |
| class="org" style="width: 130px" | Green
| class="fn"    | Rodolfo Cortes Barragan
| style="text-align:right;" | 8,741
| style="text-align:right;" | 19.7
|-

|- class="vcard"
| style="background-color: #3333FF; width: 5px;" |
| class="org" style="width: 130px" | Democratic 
| class="fn" | Lucille Roybal-Allard (incumbent) 
| style="text-align: right; margin-right: 0.5em" |  
| style="text-align: right; margin-right: 0.5em" | 77.3 
|-
|- class="vcard"
| style="background-color: #17aa5c; width: 2px;" |
| class="org" style="width: 130px" | Green
| class="fn"    | Rodolfo Cortes Barragan
| style="text-align:right;" | 27,511
| style="text-align:right;" | 22.7
|-

Endorsements

District 41 

The 41st district is based in the Inland Empire and includes Moreno Valley, Perris, and Riverside. Democrat Mark Takano, who had represented the 41st district since 2013, won re-election.

|- class="vcard"
| style="background-color: #3333FF; width: 2px;" |
| class="org" style="width: 130px" | Democratic
| class="fn"    | Mark Takano (incumbent)
| style="text-align:right;" | 45,585
| style="text-align:right;" | 58.5
|-
|- class="vcard"
| style="background-color: #E81B23; width: 2px;" |
| class="org" style="width: 130px" | Republican
| class="fn"    | Aja Smith
| style="text-align:right;" | 32,360
| style="text-align:right;" | 41.5
|-

|- class="vcard"
| style="background-color: #3333FF; width: 5px;" |
| class="org" style="width: 130px" | Democratic 
| class="fn" | Mark Takano (incumbent) 
| style="text-align: right; margin-right: 0.5em" |  
| style="text-align: right; margin-right: 0.5em" | 65.1 
|-
|- class="vcard"
| style="background-color: #E81B23; width: 2px;" |
| class="org" style="width: 130px" | Republican
| class="fn"    | Aja Smith
| style="text-align:right;" | 58,021
| style="text-align:right;" | 34.9
|-

Endorsements

District 42 

The 42nd district is based in the Inland Empire and includes Corona and Murrieta. Republican Ken Calvert, who had represented the 42nd district since 2013 and previously represented the 44th district from 2003 to 2013 and the 43rd district from 1993 to 2003, won re-election.

|- class="vcard"
| style="background-color: #E81B23; width: 2px;" |
| class="org" style="width: 130px" | Republican
| class="fn"    | Ken Calvert (incumbent)
| style="text-align:right;" | 70,289
| style="text-align:right;" | 60.8
|-
|- class="vcard"
| style="background-color: #3333FF; width: 2px;" |
| class="org" style="width: 130px" | Democratic
| class="fn"    | Julia C. Peacock
| style="text-align:right;" | 30,237
| style="text-align:right;" | 26.1
|-
|- class="vcard"
| style="background-color: #3333FF; width: 2px;" |
| class="org" style="width: 130px" | Democratic
| class="fn"    | Norman Quintero
| style="text-align:right;" | 9,540
| style="text-align:right;" | 8.2
|-
|- class="vcard"
| style="background-color: #DDDDDD; width: 2px;" |
| class="org" style="width: 130px" | No party preference
| class="fn"    | Matt Woody
| style="text-align:right;" | 5,587
| style="text-align:right;" | 4.8
|-

|- class="vcard"
| style="background-color: #E81B23; width: 5px;" |
| class="org" style="width: 130px" | Republican 
| class="fn" | Ken Calvert (incumbent) 
| style="text-align: right; margin-right: 0.5em" |  
| style="text-align: right; margin-right: 0.5em" | 56.5 
|-
|- class="vcard"
| style="background-color: #3333FF; width: 2px;" |
| class="org" style="width: 130px" | Democratic
| class="fn"    | Julia C. Peacock
| style="text-align:right;" | 100,892
| style="text-align:right;" | 43.5
|-

District 43 

The 43rd district is based in South Los Angeles and includes Hawthorne and Inglewood. Democrat Maxine Waters, who had represented the 43rd district since 2013 and previously represented the 35th district from 1993 to 2013 and the 29th district from 1991 to 1993, won re-election.

|- class="vcard"
| style="background-color: #3333FF; width: 2px;" |
| class="org" style="width: 130px" | Democratic
| class="fn"    | Maxine Waters (incumbent)
| style="text-align:right;" | 63,908
| style="text-align:right;" | 72.3
|-
|- class="vcard"
| style="background-color: #E81B23; width: 2px;" |
| class="org" style="width: 130px" | Republican
| class="fn"    | Omar Navarro
| style="text-align:right;" | 12,522
| style="text-align:right;" | 14.2
|-
|- class="vcard"
| style="background-color: #E81B23; width: 2px;" |
| class="org" style="width: 130px" | Republican
| class="fn"    | Frank T. DeMartini
| style="text-align:right;" | 6,156
| style="text-align:right;" | 7.0
|-
|- class="vcard"
| style="background-color: #E81B23; width: 2px;" |
| class="org" style="width: 130px" | Republican
| class="fn"    | Edwin P. Duterte
| style="text-align:right;" | 3,673
| style="text-align:right;" | 4.2
|-
|- class="vcard"
| style="background-color: #17aa5c; width: 2px;" |
| class="org" style="width: 130px" | Green
| class="fn"    | Miguel Angel Zuniga
| style="text-align:right;" | 2,074
| style="text-align:right;" | 2.3
|-

|- class="vcard"
| style="background-color: #3333FF; width: 5px;" |
| class="org" style="width: 130px" | Democratic 
| class="fn" | Maxine Waters (incumbent) 
| style="text-align: right; margin-right: 0.5em" |  
| style="text-align: right; margin-right: 0.5em" | 77.7 
|-
|- class="vcard"
| style="background-color: #E81B23; width: 2px;" |
| class="org" style="width: 130px" | Republican
| class="fn"    | Omar Navarro
| style="text-align:right;" | 43,780
| style="text-align:right;" | 22.3
|-

Endorsements

District 44 

The 44th district is based in south Los Angeles County and includes Carson, Compton, and San Pedro. Democrat Nanette Barragán, who had represented the 44th district since 2017, won re-election.

|- class="vcard"
| style="background-color: #3333FF; width: 2px;" |
| class="org" style="width: 130px" | Democratic
| class="fn"    | Nanette Barragán (incumbent)
| style="text-align:right;" | 39,453
| style="text-align:right;" | 65.5
|-
|- class="vcard"
| style="background-color: #3333FF; width: 2px;" |
| class="org" style="width: 130px" | Democratic
| class="fn"    | Aja Brown (withdrawn)
| style="text-align:right;" | 10,257
| style="text-align:right;" | 17.0
|-
|- class="vcard"
| style="background-color: #E81B23; width: 2px;" |
| class="org" style="width: 130px" | Republican
| class="fn"    | Jazmina Saavedra
| style="text-align:right;" | 6,153
| style="text-align:right;" | 10.2
|-
|- class="vcard"
| style="background-color: #E81B23; width: 2px;" |
| class="org" style="width: 130px" | Republican
| class="fn"    | Stacey Dash (withdrawn)
| style="text-align:right;" | 4,361
| style="text-align:right;" | 7.2
|-

|- class="vcard"
| style="background-color: #3333FF; width: 5px;" |
| class="org" style="width: 130px" | Democratic 
| class="fn" | Nanette Barragán (incumbent) 
| style="text-align: right; margin-right: 0.5em" |  
| style="text-align: right; margin-right: 0.5em" | 68.3 
|-
|- class="vcard"
| style="background-color: #3333FF; width: 2px;" |
| class="org" style="width: 130px" | Democratic
| class="fn"    | Aja Brown
| style="text-align:right;" | 45,378
| style="text-align:right;" | 31.7
|-

District 45 

The 45th district is based in inland Orange County and includes the cities of East Anaheim, Irvine and Mission Viejo. Republican Mimi Walters, who had represented the 45th district since 2015, lost re-election to Democrat Katie Porter.

|- class="vcard"
| style="background-color: #E81B23; width: 2px;" |
| class="org" style="width: 130px" | Republican
| class="fn"    | Mimi Walters (incumbent)
| style="text-align:right;" | 86,764
| style="text-align:right;" | 51.7
|-
|- class="vcard"
| style="background-color: #3333FF; width: 2px;" |
| class="org" style="width: 130px" | Democratic
| class="fn"    | Katie Porter
| style="text-align:right;" | 34,078
| style="text-align:right;" | 20.3
|-
|- class="vcard"
| style="background-color: #3333FF; width: 2px;" |
| class="org" style="width: 130px" | Democratic
| class="fn"    | Dave Min
| style="text-align:right;" | 29,979
| style="text-align:right;" | 17.8
|-
|- class="vcard"
| style="background-color: #3333FF; width: 2px;" |
| class="org" style="width: 130px" | Democratic
| class="fn"    | Brian Forde
| style="text-align:right;" | 10,107
| style="text-align:right;" | 6.0
|-
|- class="vcard"
| style="background-color: #DDDDDD; width: 2px;" |
| class="org" style="width: 130px" | No party preference
| class="fn"    | John Graham
| style="text-align:right;" | 3,817
| style="text-align:right;" | 2.3
|-
|- class="vcard"
| style="background-color: #3333FF; width: 2px;" |
| class="org" style="width: 130px" | Democratic
| class="fn"    | Kia Hamadanchy
| style="text-align:right;" | 3,212
| style="text-align:right;" | 1.9
|-

|- class="vcard"
| style="background-color: #3333FF; width: 5px;" |
| class="org" style="width: 130px" | Democratic 
| class="fn" | Katie Porter 
| style="text-align: right; margin-right: 0.5em" |  
| style="text-align: right; margin-right: 0.5em" | 52.1 
|-
|- class="vcard"
| style="background-color: #E81B23; width: 2px;" |
| class="org" style="width: 130px" | Republican
| class="fn"    | Mimi Walters (incumbent)
| style="text-align:right;" | 146,383
| style="text-align:right;" | 47.9
|-

Blue represents county supervisorial districts won by Porter. Red represents county supervisorial districts won by Walters. Gray represents county supervisorial districts with no data.

Endorsements

Polling

Primary election

General election

District 46 

The 46th district is based in central Orange County and includes Anaheim and Santa Ana. Democrat Lou Correa, who had represented the 46th district since 2017, won re-election.

|- class="vcard"
| style="background-color: #3333FF; width: 2px;" |
| class="org" style="width: 130px" | Democratic
| class="fn"    | Lou Correa (incumbent)
| style="text-align:right;" | 43,700
| style="text-align:right;" | 62.2
|-
|- class="vcard"
| style="background-color: #E81B23; width: 2px;" |
| class="org" style="width: 130px" | Republican
| class="fn"    | Russell Rene Lambert
| style="text-align:right;" | 22,770
| style="text-align:right;" | 32.4
|-
|- class="vcard"
| style="background-color: #DDDDDD; width: 2px;" |
| class="org" style="width: 130px" | No party preference
| class="fn"    | Ed Rushman
| style="text-align:right;" | 2,313
| style="text-align:right;" | 3.3
|-
|- class="vcard"
| style="background-color: #DDDDDD; width: 2px;" |
| class="org" style="width: 130px" | No party preference
| class="fn"    | Will Johnson
| style="text-align:right;" | 1,425
| style="text-align:right;" | 2.0
|-

|- class="vcard"
| style="background-color: #3333FF; width: 5px;" |
| class="org" style="width: 130px" | Democratic 
| class="fn" | Lou Correa (incumbent) 
| style="text-align: right; margin-right: 0.5em" |  
| style="text-align: right; margin-right: 0.5em" | 69.1 
|-
|- class="vcard"
| style="background-color: #E81B23; width: 2px;" |
| class="org" style="width: 130px" | Republican
| class="fn"    | Russell Rene Lambert
| style="text-align:right;" | 45,638
| style="text-align:right;" | 30.9
|-

Endorsements

District 47 

The 47th district encompasses Long Beach, Catalina Island, and parts of western Orange County, including Garden Grove and Westminster. Democrat Alan Lowenthal, who had represented the 47th district since 2013, won re-election.

|- class="vcard"
| style="background-color: #3333FF; width: 2px;" |
| class="org" style="width: 130px" | Democratic
| class="fn"    | Alan Lowenthal (incumbent)
| style="text-align:right;" | 70,539
| style="text-align:right;" | 60.6
|-
|- class="vcard"
| style="background-color: #E81B23; width: 2px;" |
| class="org" style="width: 130px" | Republican
| class="fn"    | John Briscoe
| style="text-align:right;" | 25,122
| style="text-align:right;" | 21.6
|-
|- class="vcard"
| style="background-color: #E81B23; width: 2px;" |
| class="org" style="width: 130px" | Republican
| class="fn"    | David Michael Clifford
| style="text-align:right;" | 20,687
| style="text-align:right;" | 17.8
|-

|- class="vcard"
| style="background-color: #3333FF; width: 5px;" |
| class="org" style="width: 130px" | Democratic 
| class="fn" | Alan Lowenthal (incumbent) 
| style="text-align: right; margin-right: 0.5em" |  
| style="text-align: right; margin-right: 0.5em" | 64.9 
|-
|- class="vcard"
| style="background-color: #E81B23; width: 2px;" |
| class="org" style="width: 130px" | Republican
| class="fn"    | John Briscoe
| style="text-align:right;" | 77,682
| style="text-align:right;" | 35.1
|-

Endorsements

District 48 

The 48th district is based in coastal Orange County and includes Costa Mesa, Huntington Beach and Newport Beach. Republican Dana Rohrabacher, who had represented the 48th district since 2013 and previously represented the 46th district from 2003 to 2013, the 45th district from 1993 to 2003, and the 42nd district from 1989 to 1993, lost re-election to Democrat Harley Rouda.

|- class="vcard"
| style="background-color: #E81B23; width: 2px;" |
| class="org" style="width: 130px" | Republican
| class="fn"    | Dana Rohrabacher (incumbent)
| style="text-align:right;" | 52,737
| style="text-align:right;" | 30.3
|-
|- class="vcard"
| style="background-color: #3333FF; width: 2px;" |
| class="org" style="width: 130px" | Democratic
| class="fn"    | Harley Rouda
| style="text-align:right;" | 30,099
| style="text-align:right;" | 17.3
|-
|- class="vcard"
| style="background-color: #3333FF; width: 2px;" |
| class="org" style="width: 130px" | Democratic
| class="fn"    | Hans Keirstead
| style="text-align:right;" | 29,974
| style="text-align:right;" | 17.2
|-
|- class="vcard"
| style="background-color: #E81B23; width: 2px;" |
| class="org" style="width: 130px" | Republican
| class="fn"    | Scott Baugh
| style="text-align:right;" | 27,514
| style="text-align:right;" | 15.8
|-
|- class="vcard"
| style="background-color: #3333FF; width: 2px;" |
| class="org" style="width: 130px" | Democratic
| class="fn"    | Omar Siddiqui
| style="text-align:right;" | 8,658
| style="text-align:right;" | 5.0
|-
|- class="vcard"
| style="background-color: #E81B23; width: 2px;" |
| class="org" style="width: 130px" | Republican
| class="fn"    | John Gabbard
| style="text-align:right;" | 5,664
| style="text-align:right;" | 3.3
|-
|- class="vcard"
| style="background-color: #3333FF; width: 2px;" |
| class="org" style="width: 130px" | Democratic
| class="fn"    | Rachel Payne (withdrawn)
| style="text-align:right;" | 3,598
| style="text-align:right;" | 2.1
|-
|- class="vcard"
| style="background-color: #E81B23; width: 2px;" |
| class="org" style="width: 130px" | Republican
| class="fn"    | Paul Martin
| style="text-align:right;" | 2,893
| style="text-align:right;" | 1.7
|-
|- class="vcard"
| style="background-color: #E81B23; width: 2px;" |
| class="org" style="width: 130px" | Republican
| class="fn"    | Shastina Sandman
| style="text-align:right;" | 2,762
| style="text-align:right;" | 1.6
|-
|- class="vcard"
| style="background-color: #3333FF; width: 2px;" |
| class="org" style="width: 130px" | Democratic
| class="fn"    | Michael Kotick (withdrawn)
| style="text-align:right;" | 2,606
| style="text-align:right;" | 1.5
|-
|- class="vcard"
| style="background-color: #3333FF; width: 2px;" |
| class="org" style="width: 130px" | Democratic
| class="fn"    | Laura Oatman (withdrawn)
| style="text-align:right;" | 2,412
| style="text-align:right;" | 1.4
|-
|- class="vcard"
| style="background-color: #3333FF; width: 2px;" |
| class="org" style="width: 130px" | Democratic
| class="fn"    | Deanie Schaarsmith
| style="text-align:right;" | 1,433
| style="text-align:right;" | 0.8
|-
|- class="vcard"
| style="background-color: #3333FF; width: 2px;" |
| class="org" style="width: 130px" | Democratic
| class="fn"    | Tony Zarkades
| style="text-align:right;" | 1,281
| style="text-align:right;" | 0.7
|-
|- class="vcard"
| style="background-color: ; width: 2px;" |
| class="org" style="width: 130px" | 
| class="fn"    | Brandon Reiser
| style="text-align:right;" | 964
| style="text-align:right;" | 0.6
|-
|- class="vcard"
| style="background-color: #E81B23; width: 2px;" |
| class="org" style="width: 130px" | Republican
| class="fn"    | Stelian Onufrei (withdrawn)
| style="text-align:right;" | 739
| style="text-align:right;" | 0.4
|-
|- class="vcard"
| style="background-color: #DDDDDD; width: 2px;" |
| class="org" style="width: 130px" | No party preference
| class="fn"    | Kevin Kensinger
| style="text-align:right;" | 690
| style="text-align:right;" | 0.4
|-

|- class="vcard"
| style="background-color: #3333FF; width: 5px;" |
| class="org" style="width: 130px" | Democratic 
| class="fn" | Harley Rouda 
| style="text-align: right; margin-right: 0.5em" |  
| style="text-align: right; margin-right: 0.5em" | 53.6 
|-
|- class="vcard"
| style="background-color: #E81B23; width: 2px;" |
| class="org" style="width: 130px" | Republican
| class="fn"    | Dana Rohrabacher (incumbent)
| style="text-align:right;" | 136,899
| style="text-align:right;" | 46.4
|-

Rouda won all 3 county supervisorial districts. Blue represents county supervisorial districts won by Rouda.

Debates
Complete video of debate, October 15, 2018

Endorsements

Polling

Primary election

General election

District 49 

The 49th district is based in northern San Diego County and parts of southern Orange County. It includes the cities of Carlsbad, Oceanside, San Juan Capistrano and San Clemente. Republican Darrell Issa, who had represented the 49th district since 2003 and the 48th district from 2001 to 2003, retired and did not run in 2018. Democrat Mike Levin won this seat.

|- class="vcard"
| style="background-color: #E81B23; width: 2px;" |
| class="org" style="width: 130px" | Republican
| class="fn"    | Diane Harkey
| style="text-align:right;" | 46,468
| style="text-align:right;" | 25.5
|-
|- class="vcard"
| style="background-color: #3333FF; width: 2px;" |
| class="org" style="width: 130px" | Democratic
| class="fn"    | Mike Levin
| style="text-align:right;" | 31,850
| style="text-align:right;" | 17.5
|-
|- class="vcard"
| style="background-color: #3333FF; width: 2px;" |
| class="org" style="width: 130px" | Democratic
| class="fn"    | Sara Jacobs
| style="text-align:right;" | 28,778
| style="text-align:right;" | 15.8
|-
|- class="vcard"
| style="background-color: #3333FF; width: 2px;" |
| class="org" style="width: 130px" | Democratic
| class="fn"    | Doug Applegate
| style="text-align:right;" | 23,850
| style="text-align:right;" | 13.1
|-
|- class="vcard"
| style="background-color: #E81B23; width: 2px;" |
| class="org" style="width: 130px" | Republican
| class="fn"    | Kristin Gaspar
| style="text-align:right;" | 15,467
| style="text-align:right;" | 8.5
|-
|- class="vcard"
| style="background-color: #E81B23; width: 2px;" |
| class="org" style="width: 130px" | Republican
| class="fn"    | Rocky Chávez
| style="text-align:right;" | 13,739
| style="text-align:right;" | 7.5
|-
|- class="vcard"
| style="background-color: #3333FF; width: 2px;" |
| class="org" style="width: 130px" | Democratic
| class="fn"    | Paul G. Kerr
| style="text-align:right;" | 8,099
| style="text-align:right;" | 4.4
|-
|- class="vcard"
| style="background-color: #E81B23; width: 2px;" |
| class="org" style="width: 130px" | Republican
| class="fn"    | Brian Maryott
| style="text-align:right;" | 5,496
| style="text-align:right;" | 3.0
|-
|- class="vcard"
| style="background-color: #E81B23; width: 2px;" |
| class="org" style="width: 130px" | Republican
| class="fn"    | Mike Schmitt
| style="text-align:right;" | 2,379
| style="text-align:right;" | 1.3
|-
|- class="vcard"
| style="background-color: #E81B23; width: 2px;" |
| class="org" style="width: 130px" | Republican
| class="fn"    | Josh Schoonover
| style="text-align:right;" | 1,362
| style="text-align:right;" | 0.7
|-
|- class="vcard"
| style="background-color: #E81B23; width: 2px;" |
| class="org" style="width: 130px" | Republican
| class="fn"    | Craig A. Nordal
| style="text-align:right;" | 1,156
| style="text-align:right;" | 0.6
|-
|- class="vcard"
| style="background-color: #E81B23; width: 2px;" |
| class="org" style="width: 130px" | Republican
| class="fn"    | David Medway
| style="text-align:right;" | 1,066
| style="text-align:right;" | 0.6
|-
|- class="vcard"
| style="background-color: #DDDDDD; width: 2px;" |
| class="org" style="width: 130px" | No party preference
| class="fn"    | Robert Pendleton
| style="text-align:right;" | 905
| style="text-align:right;" | 0.5
|-
|- class="vcard"
| style="background-color: #17aa5c; width: 2px;" |
| class="org" style="width: 130px" | Green
| class="fn"    | Danielle St. John
| style="text-align:right;" | 690
| style="text-align:right;" | 0.4
|-
|- class="vcard"
| style="background-color: #FED105; width: 2px;" |
| class="org" style="width: 130px" | Libertarian
| class="fn"    | Joshua L. Hancock
| style="text-align:right;" | 552
| style="text-align:right;" | 0.3
|-
|- class="vcard"
| style="background-color: #00FF00; width: 2px;" |
| class="org" style="width: 130px" | Peace and Freedom
| class="fn"    | Jordan J. Mills
| style="text-align:right;" | 233
| style="text-align:right;" | 0.1
|-

|- class="vcard"
| style="background-color: #3333FF; width: 5px;" |
| class="org" style="width: 130px" | Democratic 
| class="fn" | Mike Levin 
| style="text-align: right; margin-right: 0.5em" |  
| style="text-align: right; margin-right: 0.5em" | 56.4 
|-
|- class="vcard"
| style="background-color: #E81B23; width: 2px;" |
| class="org" style="width: 130px" | Republican
| class="fn"    | Diane Harkey
| style="text-align:right;" | 128,577
| style="text-align:right;" | 43.6
|-

Blue represents counties won by Levin. Red represents counties won by Harkey.

Endorsements

Debates
Complete video of debate, October 2, 2018

Polling

Primary election

General election

District 50 

The 50th district is based in inland San Diego County and includes Escondido and Santee. Republican Duncan D. Hunter, who had represented the 50th district since 2013 and previously represented the 52nd district from 2009 to 2013, won re-election.

|- class="vcard"
| style="background-color: #E81B23; width: 2px;" |
| class="org" style="width: 130px" | Republican
| class="fn"    | Duncan D. Hunter (incumbent)
| style="text-align:right;" | 69,563
| style="text-align:right;" | 47.4
|-
|- class="vcard"
| style="background-color: #3333FF; width: 2px;" |
| class="org" style="width: 130px" | Democratic
| class="fn"    | Ammar Campa-Najjar
| style="text-align:right;" | 25,799
| style="text-align:right;" | 17.6
|-
|- class="vcard"
| style="background-color: #E81B23; width: 2px;" |
| class="org" style="width: 130px" | Republican
| class="fn"    | Bill Wells
| style="text-align:right;" | 18,951
| style="text-align:right;" | 12.9
|-
|- class="vcard"
| style="background-color: #3333FF; width: 2px;" |
| class="org" style="width: 130px" | Democratic
| class="fn"    | Josh Butner
| style="text-align:right;" | 18,944
| style="text-align:right;" | 12.9
|-
|- class="vcard"
| style="background-color: #3333FF; width: 2px;" |
| class="org" style="width: 130px" | Democratic
| class="fn"    | Patrick Malloy
| style="text-align:right;" | 8,607
| style="text-align:right;" | 5.9
|-
|- class="vcard"
| style="background-color: #E81B23; width: 2px;" |
| class="org" style="width: 130px" | Republican
| class="fn"    | S. "Shamus" Sayed
| style="text-align:right;" | 3,079
| style="text-align:right;" | 2.1
|-
|- class="vcard"
| style="background-color: #DDDDDD; width: 2px;" |
| class="org" style="width: 130px" | No party preference
| class="fn"    | Richard Kahle
| style="text-align:right;" | 1,714
| style="text-align:right;" | 1.2
|-

|- class="vcard"
| style="background-color: #E81B23; width: 5px;" |
| class="org" style="width: 130px" | Republican 
| class="fn" | Duncan D. Hunter (incumbent) 
| style="text-align: right; margin-right: 0.5em" |  
| style="text-align: right; margin-right: 0.5em" | 51.7 
|-
|- class="vcard"
| style="background-color: #3333FF; width: 2px;" |
| class="org" style="width: 130px" | Democratic
| class="fn"    | Ammar Campa-Najjar
| style="text-align:right;" | 125,448
| style="text-align:right;" | 48.3
|-

Endorsements

Polling

Primary election

General election

District 51 

The new 51st district runs along the border with Mexico and includes Imperial County and San Diego. Democrat Juan Vargas, who had represented the 51st district since 2013, won re-election.

|- class="vcard"
| style="background-color: #3333FF; width: 2px;" |
| class="org" style="width: 130px" | Democratic
| class="fn"    | Juan Vargas (incumbent)
| style="text-align:right;" | 50,132
| style="text-align:right;" | 64.0
|-
|- class="vcard"
| style="background-color: #E81B23; width: 2px;" |
| class="org" style="width: 130px" | Republican
| class="fn"    | Juan M. Hidalgo Jr.
| style="text-align:right;" | 11,972
| style="text-align:right;" | 15.3
|-
|- class="vcard"
| style="background-color: #E81B23; width: 2px;" |
| class="org" style="width: 130px" | Republican
| class="fn"    | John Renison
| style="text-align:right;" | 10,972
| style="text-align:right;" | 14.0
|-
|- class="vcard"
| style="background-color: #DDDDDD; width: 2px;" |
| class="org" style="width: 130px" | No party preference
| class="fn"    | Juan (Charlie) Carlos Mercado
| style="text-align:right;" | 2,452
| style="text-align:right;" | 3.1
|-
|- class="vcard"
| style="background-color: #DDDDDD; width: 2px;" |
| class="org" style="width: 130px" | No party preference
| class="fn"    | Kevin Mitchell
| style="text-align:right;" | 1,473
| style="text-align:right;" | 1.9
|-
|- class="vcard"
| style="background-color: #E81B23; width: 2px;" |
| class="org" style="width: 130px" | Republican
| class="fn"    | Louis A. Fuentes
| style="text-align:right;" | 1,310
| style="text-align:right;" | 1.7
|-

|- class="vcard"
| style="background-color: #3333FF; width: 5px;" |
| class="org" style="width: 130px" | Democratic 
| class="fn" | Juan Vargas (incumbent) 
| style="text-align: right; margin-right: 0.5em" |  
| style="text-align: right; margin-right: 0.5em" | 71.2 
|-
|- class="vcard"
| style="background-color: #E81B23; width: 2px;" |
| class="org" style="width: 130px" | Republican
| class="fn"    | Juan M. Hidalgo Jr.
| style="text-align:right;" | 44,301
| style="text-align:right;" | 28.8
|-

District 52 

The 52nd district is based in coastal San Diego and includes La Jolla and Poway. Democrat Scott Peters, who had represented the 52nd district since 2013, won re-election.

|- class="vcard"
| style="background-color: #3333FF; width: 2px;" |
| class="org" style="width: 130px" | Democratic
| class="fn"    | Scott Peters (incumbent)
| style="text-align:right;" | 98,744
| style="text-align:right;" | 59.0
|-
|- class="vcard"
| style="background-color: #E81B23; width: 2px;" |
| class="org" style="width: 130px" | Republican
| class="fn"    | Omar Qudrat
| style="text-align:right;" | 25,530
| style="text-align:right;" | 15.3
|-
|- class="vcard"
| style="background-color: #E81B23; width: 2px;" |
| class="org" style="width: 130px" | Republican
| class="fn"    | James Veltmeyer
| style="text-align:right;" | 19,040
| style="text-align:right;" | 11.4
|-
|- class="vcard"
| style="background-color: #E81B23; width: 2px;" |
| class="org" style="width: 130px" | Republican
| class="fn"    | Daniel Casara
| style="text-align:right;" | 7,680
| style="text-align:right;" | 4.6
|-
|- class="vcard"
| style="background-color: #E81B23; width: 2px;" |
| class="org" style="width: 130px" | Republican
| class="fn"    | Michael Allman
| style="text-align:right;" | 6,561
| style="text-align:right;" | 3.9
|-
|- class="vcard"
| style="background-color: #E81B23; width: 2px;" |
| class="org" style="width: 130px" | Republican
| class="fn"    | John Horst
| style="text-align:right;" | 5,654
| style="text-align:right;" | 3.4
|-
|- class="vcard"
| style="background-color: #E81B23; width: 2px;" |
| class="org" style="width: 130px" | Republican
| class="fn"    | Jeffery Cullen
| style="text-align:right;" | 4,027
| style="text-align:right;" | 2.4
|-

|- class="vcard"
| style="background-color: #3333FF; width: 5px;" |
| class="org" style="width: 130px" | Democratic 
| class="fn" | Scott Peters (incumbent) 
| style="text-align: right; margin-right: 0.5em" |  
| style="text-align: right; margin-right: 0.5em" | 63.8 
|-
|- class="vcard"
| style="background-color: #E81B23; width: 2px;" |
| class="org" style="width: 130px" | Republican
| class="fn"    | Omar Qudrat
| style="text-align:right;" | 107,015
| style="text-align:right;" | 36.2
|-

Endorsements

District 53 

The 53rd district is based in Central San Diego and includes La Mesa and Lemon Grove. Democrat Susan Davis, who had represented the 53rd district since 2003 and previously represented the 49th district from 2001 to 2003, won re-election.

|- class="vcard"
| style="background-color: #3333FF; width: 2px;" |
| class="org" style="width: 130px" | Democratic
| class="fn"    | Susan Davis (incumbent)
| style="text-align:right;" | 93,051
| style="text-align:right;" | 64.1
|-
|- class="vcard"
| style="background-color: #E81B23; width: 2px;" |
| class="org" style="width: 130px" | Republican
| class="fn"    | Morgan Murtaugh
| style="text-align:right;" | 20,827
| style="text-align:right;" | 14.3
|-
|- class="vcard"
| style="background-color: #E81B23; width: 2px;" |
| class="org" style="width: 130px" | Republican
| class="fn"    | Matt Mendoza
| style="text-align:right;" | 19,710
| style="text-align:right;" | 13.6
|-
|- class="vcard"
| style="background-color: #E81B23; width: 2px;" |
| class="org" style="width: 130px" | Republican
| class="fn"    | Shawn Gino Kane
| style="text-align:right;" | 5,319
| style="text-align:right;" | 3.7
|-
|- class="vcard"
| style="background-color: #DDDDDD; width: 2px;" |
| class="org" style="width: 130px" | No party preference
| class="fn"    | Bryan Kim
| style="text-align:right;" | 3,460
| style="text-align:right;" | 2.4
|-
|- class="vcard"
| style="background-color: #E81B23; width: 2px;" |
| class="org" style="width: 130px" | Republican
| class="fn"    | Brett A. Goda
| style="text-align:right;" | 2,899
| style="text-align:right;" | 2.0
|-

|- class="vcard"
| style="background-color: #3333FF; width: 5px;" |
| class="org" style="width: 130px" | Democratic 
| class="fn" | Susan Davis (incumbent) 
| style="text-align: right; margin-right: 0.5em" |  
| style="text-align: right; margin-right: 0.5em" | 69.1 
|-
|- class="vcard"
| style="background-color: #E81B23; width: 2px;" |
| class="org" style="width: 130px" | Republican
| class="fn"    | Morgan Murtaugh
| style="text-align:right;" | 83,127
| style="text-align:right;" | 30.9
|-

Endorsements

See also

 2018 United States House of Representatives elections
 2018 United States elections

Notes

References
General

Specific

External links
Candidates at Vote Smart 
Candidates at Ballotpedia 
Campaign finance at FEC 
Campaign finance at OpenSecrets

California
2018
United States House